= Prince-Bishopric of Verdun =

Former state of the Holy Roman Empire ruled by the Bishop of Verdun

Prince-Bishopric of Verdun Fürstbistum Wirten (German) Principauté épiscopale de Verdun (French)
- Prince-bishopric of Holy Roman Empire
- 997–1552
- Coat of arms

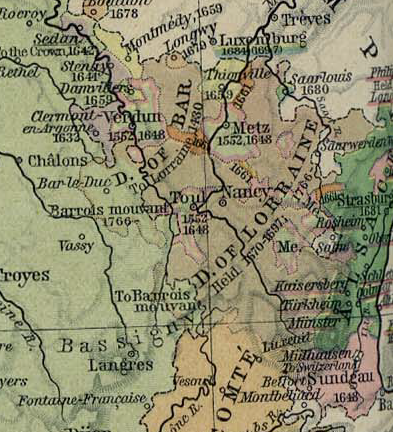
- The Three Bishoprics of Verdun, Metz and Toul in the upper half of this map, coloured green and outlined in pink.
- Capital: Verdun
  - Type: Ecclesiastical principality
- Historical era: Middle Ages
  - County established: 10th century
  - County ceded to the bishopric: 997
  - Three Bishoprics annexed by France: 1552
  - Peace of Westphalia recognises annexation: 1648
Preceded by	Succeeded by
County of Verdun	Three Bishoprics

Location of Diocese of Verdun

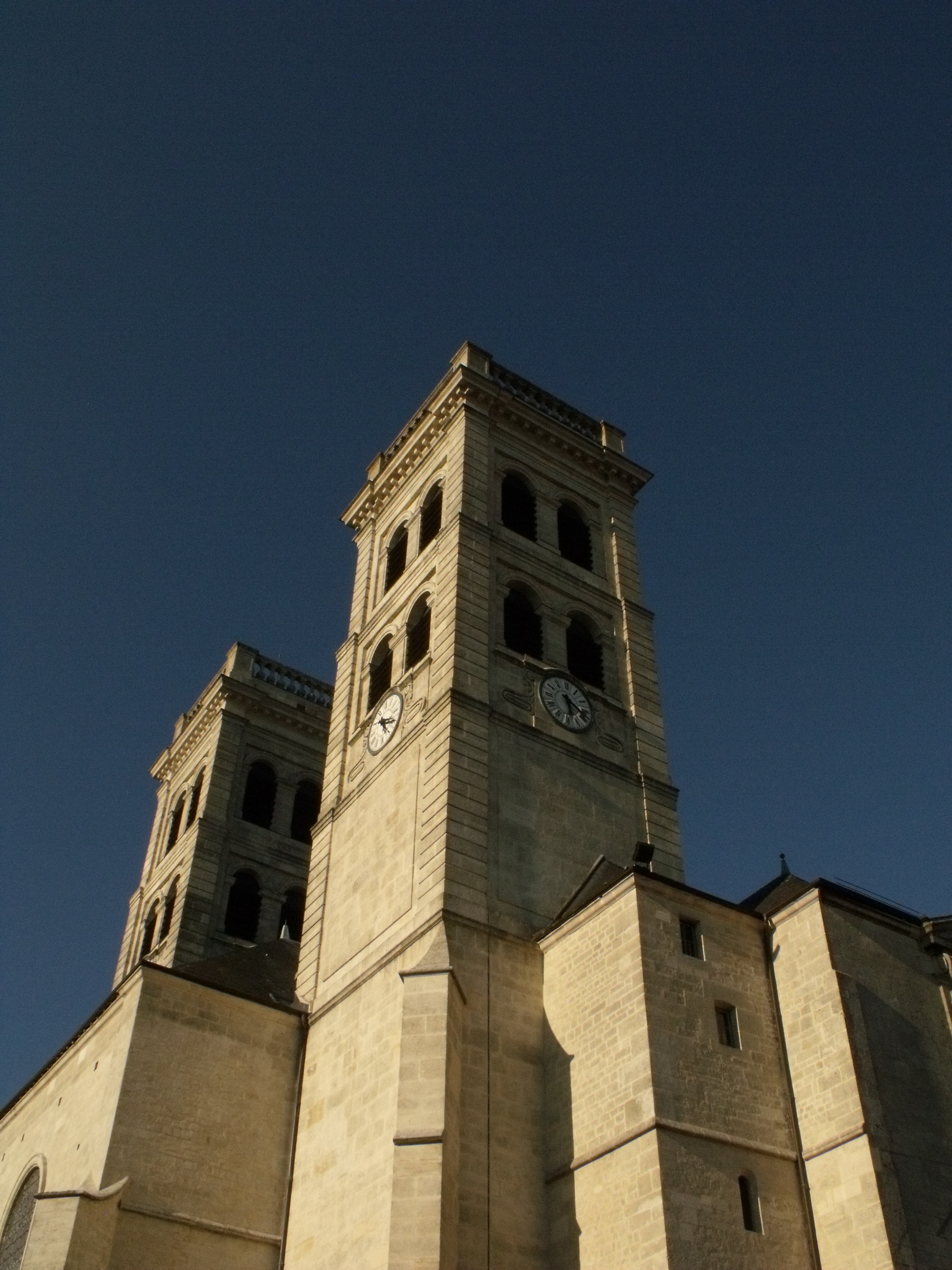
Verdun Cathedral

The Prince-Bishopric of Verdun was a state of the Holy Roman Empire. It was located at the western edge of the Empire and was bordered by France, the Duchy of Luxembourg, and the Duchy of Bar. Some time in the late 990s, the suzerainty of the County of Verdun passed from Herman of Ename of the House of Ardenne–Verdun to the Bishopric of Verdun.

== History ==
This fief also included the advowson of the church of Verdun over its possessions along the river Moselle. According to a chronist's report, written around the year 900, the Merovingian king Childebert II (575–596) came to visit Verdun. There was not enough wine to serve the monarch and the Bishop Agericus was very embarrassed. However God rewarded him for his good deeds and miraculously increased the amount of wine. The king presented Agericus of Verdun with the Schloss Veldenz as a fief of Verdun "because of the wine". Around 1156 Frederick Barbarossa confirmed the holding by Bishop Albert I of Verdun of the castle together with the surrounding land.

A story that Peter (774-798), successor of Madalvaeus, was granted temporal lordship of the Diocese by Charlemagne, but this is no longer accepted.

Because of the destruction of the archives in a fire, Bishop Dadon (880-923) commissioned the Gesta episcoporum Virodunensium (Chronicle of the Bishops of Verdun) from Bertharius, a Benedictine monk. This was continued to 1250 by a second monk, Lawrence, and later by an anonymous writer.

A key element of Emperor Otto I's domestic policy was to strengthen ecclesiastical authorities at the expense of the nobility who threatened his power. To this end he filled the ranks of the episcopate with his own relatives and with loyal chancery clerks. As protector of the Church he invested them with the symbols of their offices, both spiritual and secular, so the clerics were appointed as his vassals through a commendation ceremony. Historian Norman Cantor concludes: "Under these conditions clerical election became a mere formality in the Ottonian empire ..." The Bishop of Verdun, appointed by Otto, was totally faithful to the emperor.

In 990 Bishop Haimont ordered the construction of a new cathedral on the Romano-Rhenish plan: a nave, two transepts, two opposing apses, each one flanked by two bell towers. The Holy Roman Emperor Otto III bestowed the title Count on Bishop Haimont (990-1024) and his successors in 997. The bishops had the right to appoint a temporary "count for life" (comte viager), theoretically subject to the authority of the bishop. These counts were selected from the noble family of Ardennes. There was frequent conflict between the count and the bishop.

With the marriage of Philip IV with Joan I of Navarre, the daughter of the Count of Champagne, Lorraine and particularly Verdun become a primary focus for the crown of France. After 1331, appointment to the episcopal see was controlled by the King of France rather than the Emperor.

The Bishopric was annexed to France in 1552; this was recognized by the Holy Roman Empire in the Peace of Westphalia of 1648. It then was a part of the province of the Three Bishoprics.

== List of prince-bishops ==
- 990–1024: Haimont (Heymon)
- 1024–1039: Reginbert
- 1039–1046: Richard I
- 1047–1089: Theoderic
- 1089–1107: Richer
- 1107–1114: Richard II of Grandpré
- 1114–1117: Mazo, administrator
- 1117–1129: Henry I of Blois, deposed at the Council of Chalon (1129)
- 1129–1131: Ursion de Watronville
- 1131–1156: Adalbero III of Chiny
- 1156–1162: Albert I of Marcey
- 1163–1171: Richard III of Crisse
- 1172–1181: Arnulf of Chiny-Verdun
- 1181–1186: Henry II of Castel
- 1186–1208: Albert II of Hierges
- 1208–1216: Robert I of Grandpré
- 1217–1224: John I of Aspremont
- 1224–1245: Radulf of Torote
- 1245–1245: Guy (Wido) I of Traignel
- 1245–1247: Guy (Wido) II of Mellote
- 1247–1252: John II of Aachen
- 1252–1255: James (Jacques) I Pantaléon of Court-Palais
- 1255–1271: Robert II of Médidan
- 1271–1273: Ulrich of Sarvay
- 1275–1278: Gerard of Grandson
- 1278–1286: Henri of Grandson
- 1289–1296: James (Jacques) II of Ruvigny
- 1297–1302: John III of Richericourt
- 1303–1305: Thomas of Blankenberg
- 1305–1312: Nicholas I of Neuville
- 1312–1349: Henry IV of Aspremont
- 1349–1351: Otto of Poitiers
- 1352–1361: Hugh III of Bar
- 1362–1371: John IV of Bourbon-Montperoux
- 1371–1375: John V of Dampierre-St. Dizier
- 1375–1379: Guy III of Roye
- 1380–1404: Leobald of Cousance
- 1404–1419: John VI of Saarbrücken
- 1419–1423: Louis I of Bar († 1430), administrator
- 1423–1423: Raymond
- 1423–1424: William of Montjoie
- 1424–1430: Louis I of Bar († 1430), administrator
- 1430–1437: Louis of Haraucourt
- 1437–1449: Guillaume Fillastre
- 1449–1456: Louis of Haraucourt
- 1457–1500: William of Haraucourt
- 1500–1508: Warry de Dommartin
- 1508–1522: Louis de Lorraine
- 1523–1544: Jean de Lorraine (1498–1550), brother of predecessor
- 1544–1547: Nicolas de Mercœur (1524–1577), nephew of predecessor
- 1548–1575: Nicolas Psaume. The Bishopric was annexed to France in 1552. This was not formally recognised in the Empire until the Peace of Westphalia in 1648.
- 1576–1584: Nicolas Bousmard
- 1585–1587: Charles de Lorraine
- 1588–1593: Nicolas Boucher
- 1593–1610: Eric of Lorraine
  - 1593–1601: Christophe de la Vallée, administrator
- 1610–1622: Charles de Lorraine, nephew of predecessor

== See also ==
- Roman Catholic Diocese of Verdun
- Verdun Cathedral
- Counts of Verdun
