= February 8 =

February 8 this year in various calendars
- Sunday, 8 February 2026
Akan	Kwakwasi
Armenian	23 Mehekani 1475
Aztec	Etzalcualiztli 9, 4 Ōlīn
Babylonian	19 Tebetu, 2336 SE
Balinese pawukon	Menga, Beteng, Sri, Umanis, Was, Redite of Menail, Sri, Tulus, Pandita
Bengali	25 Magh, BS 1432
Chinese	Yin Water Ox・Room Mansion; Wood Snake Year, Month 12, Day 21 (Lichun, 10 days until Yushui)
Common Era	8 February 2026 CE
Coptic	1 Meshir, AM 1742
Egyptian	28 Payni, 2774 NE
Ethiopian	1 Yakātit, 2018 Amätä Məhrät
French Republican	Décade II, Décadi de Pluviôse de l'Année 234 de la République
Gregorian	8 February, AD 2026
Hebrew	21 Shevat, AM 5786
Hindu	Svātī・Śūla; Solar: 26 Māgha, 1947 SE; Lunisolar: Saptamī, Kṛishna pakṣa of Māgha, 2082 VE; Siddhārthin・5126 KY・1,872,614
Icelandic	Sunnudagur, 17 Þorri 2025
Islamic	20 Sha'aban, AH 1447 (using tabular method)
ISO week date	2026-W06-7
Japanese	21 Shiwasu, Reiwa 8 (Risshun, 11 days until Usui)
Julian	26 January, AD 2026 (AM 7534)
Julian day	2461080
Korean	21 Sodal, 4358 DE
Maya	13.0.13.5.17; 15 Pax, 4 Caban
Roman	ante diem VII Kalendas Februarias, MMDCCLXXIX AUC
Solar Hijri	19 Bahman, SH 1404
Tibetan	22 rgyal, shing mo sbrul 2152 or 1771 or 999

<<	February					>>
Su	Mo	Tu	We	Th	Fr	Sa
1	2	3	4	5	6	7
8	9	10	11	12	13	14
15	16	17	18	19	20	21
22	23	24	25	26	27	28
2026

February 8 in recent years
2026 (Sunday)
2025 (Saturday)
2024 (Thursday)
2023 (Wednesday)
2022 (Tuesday)
2021 (Monday)
2020 (Saturday)
2019 (Friday)
2018 (Thursday)
2017 (Wednesday)

February 8 is the 39th day of the year in the Gregorian calendar; 326 days remain until the end of the year (327 in leap years).

== Events ==
=== Pre-1600 ===
- 421 – Constantius III becomes co-emperor of the Western Roman Empire.
- 1238 – The Mongols burn the Russian city of Vladimir.
- 1250 – Seventh Crusade: Crusaders engage Ayyubid forces in the Battle of Al Mansurah.
- 1347 – The Byzantine civil war of 1341–47 ends with a power-sharing agreement between John VI Kantakouzenos and John V Palaiologos.
- 1587 – Mary, Queen of Scots is executed on suspicion of having been involved in the Babington Plot to murder her cousin, Queen Elizabeth I.

=== 1601–1900 ===
- 1601 – Robert Devereux, 2nd Earl of Essex, unsuccessfully rebels against Queen Elizabeth I.
- 1693 – The College of William & Mary in Williamsburg, Virginia, the second-oldest institution of higher education in the Thirteen Colonies, is granted a charter by King William III and Queen Mary II.
- 1807 – Napoleon defeats the coalition forces of Russian General Bennigsen and Prussian General L'Estocq at the Battle of Eylau.
- 1817 – An army led by Grand Marshal Las Heras crosses the Andes to join San Martín in the liberation of Chile from Spain.
- 1837 – Richard Johnson becomes the first and only Vice President of the United States chosen by the Senate.
- 1865 – Delaware refuses to ratify the Thirteenth Amendment to the U.S. Constitution, delaying the criminalization of slavery until the amendment's national adoption on December 6, 1865. The amendment is ultimately ratified by Delaware on February 12, 1901, the 92nd anniversary of Abraham Lincoln's birth.
- 1879 – Sandford Fleming first proposes the adoption of Universal Standard Time at a meeting of the Royal Canadian Institute.
- 1879 – England's cricket team, led by Lord Harris, is attacked in a riot during a match in Sydney.
- 1885 – The first Japanese immigrants arrive in Hawaii.
- 1887 – The Dawes Act is enacted, authorizing the U.S. President to divide Native American tribal land into individual allotments.

=== 1901–present ===
- 1904 – Japanese forces launch a surprise attack against Russian-controlled Port Arthur, marking the start of the Russo-Japanese war.
- 1904 – The Dutch Colonial Army's Marechaussee regiment led by General G.C.E. van Daalen launch a military campaign in the Dutch East Indies' Northern Sumatra region, leading to the deaths of thousands of civilians.
- 1910 – The Boy Scouts of America is incorporated by William D. Boyce.
- 1924 – The first state execution in the United States by gas chamber takes place in Nevada.
- 1937 – Spanish Civil War: Republican forces establish the Interprovincial Council of Santander, Palencia and Burgos in Cantabria.
- 1942 – World War II: Japan invades Singapore.
- 1945 – World War II: British and Canadian forces commence Operation Veritable to occupy land between the Maas and Rhine rivers.
- 1945 – World War II: Mikhail Devyataev escapes with nine other Soviet POWs from a Nazi concentration camp in Peenemünde, Usedom.
- 1946 – The People's Republic of Korea is dissolved in the North and replaced by the communist-controlled Provisional People's Committee of North Korea.
- 1950 – The Stasi, the secret police of East Germany, is established.
- 1960 – Queen Elizabeth II issues an Order-in-Council, proclaiming the House of Windsor and declaring that her descendants will take the name Mountbatten-Windsor.
- 1962 – Nine protestors are killed at Charonne station, Paris, by French police under the command of ex-Vichy official and Parisian Prefect of Police Maurice Papon.
- 1963 – The regime of Prime Minister of Iraq Abd al-Karim Qasim is overthrown by the Ba'ath Party.
- 1965 – Eastern Air Lines Flight 663 crashes into the Atlantic Ocean and explodes, killing all 84 people on board.
- 1968 – American civil rights movement: An attack on Black students from South Carolina State University who are protesting racial segregation leaves three dead and 28 injured in Orangeburg, South Carolina.
- 1971 – South Vietnamese ground troops launch an incursion into Laos to try to cut off the Ho Chi Minh trail and stop communist infiltration into the country.
- 1974 – The crew of Skylab 4, the last mission to visit the American space station Skylab, returns to Earth after 84 days in space.
- 1983 – A dust storm hits Melbourne, resulting in the worst drought on record and severe weather conditions in the city.
- 1986 – Twenty-three people are killed when a VIA Rail passenger train collides with a Canadian National freight train near the town of Hinton, Alberta, making it one of the worst rail accidents in Canada.
- 1989 – Independent Air Flight 1851 strikes Pico Alto mountain while on approach to Santa Maria Airport in the Azores, killing all 144 passengers on board.
- 1993 – An Iran Air Tours Tupolev Tu-154 and an Iranian Air Force Sukhoi Su-24 collide mid-air near Qods, Iran, killing all 133 people on board both aircraft.
- 2010 – Over 2 miles (3.2 km) of road are buried after a storm in the Hindu Kush mountains of Afghanistan triggers a series of avalanches, killing at least 172 people and trapping over 2,000 others.
- 2013 – A blizzard kills at least 18 and leaves hundreds of thousands of people without electricity in the northeastern United States and parts of Canada.
- 2014 – A hotel fire in Medina, Saudi Arabia, kills 15 Egyptian pilgrims with 130 others injured.
- 2020 – A soldier opens fire in a military camp and a shopping center in Nakhon Ratchasima, Thailand, killing 29 people and injuring 58 others before being shot dead by police the next day. It is considered the deadliest mass shooting in the country's history.
- 2023 – Two children are killed and six others are injured when a bus crashes into a daycare centre in Laval, Quebec, Canada. The driver is arrested and charged with homicide and dangerous driving.

== Births ==
=== Pre-1600 ===
- 120 – Vettius Valens, Greek astronomer, mathematician, and astrologer (died ~175)
- 412 – Proclus, Greek mathematician and philosopher (died ~485)
- 882 – Muhammad ibn Tughj al-Ikhshid, Egyptian commander and politician, Abbasid Governor of Egypt (died 946)
- 1191 – Yaroslav II of Vladimir (died 1246)
- 1291 – Afonso IV of Portugal, Portuguese king (died 1357)
- 1405 – Constantine XI Palaiologos, Byzantine emperor (died 1453)
- 1487 – Ulrich, Duke of Württemberg, German duke (died 1550)
- 1514 – Daniele Barbaro, Venetian churchman, diplomat and scholar (died 1570)
- 1552 – Agrippa d'Aubigné, French poet and soldier (died 1630)
- 1577 – Robert Burton, English priest, physician, and scholar (died 1640)
- 1591 – Guercino, Italian painter (died 1666)

=== 1601–1900 ===
- 1685 – Charles-Jean-François Hénault, French historian and author (died 1770)
- 1700 – Daniel Bernoulli, Dutch-Swiss mathematician and physicist (died 1782)
- 1720 – Emperor Sakuramachi, Japanese emperor (died 1750)
- 1741 – André Grétry, Belgian-French organist and composer (died 1813)
- 1762 – Gia Long, Vietnamese emperor (died 1820)
- 1764 – Joseph Leopold Eybler, Austrian composer and conductor (died 1846)
- 1792 – Caroline Augusta of Bavaria, German princess (died 1873)
- 1798 – Grand Duke Michael Pavlovich of Russia, Russian grand duke (died 1849)
- 1807 – Benjamin Waterhouse Hawkins, English sculptor and zoologist (died 1889)
- 1817 – Richard S. Ewell, American general (died 1872)
- 1819 – John Ruskin, English author, critic, and academic (died 1900)
- 1820 – William Tecumseh Sherman, American general (died 1891)
- 1822 – Maxime Du Camp, French photographer and journalist (died 1894)
- 1825 – Henry Walter Bates, English geographer, biologist, and explorer (died 1892)
- 1828 – Jules Verne, French author, poet, and playwright (died 1905)
- 1829 – Vital-Justin Grandin, French-Canadian bishop and missionary (died 1902)
- 1834 – Dmitri Mendeleev, Russian chemist and academic (died 1907)
- 1850 – Kate Chopin, American author (died 1904)
- 1860 – Adella Brown Bailey, American politician and suffragist (died 1937)
- 1866 – Moses Gomberg, Ukrainian-American chemist and academic (died 1947)
- 1876 – Paula Modersohn-Becker, German painter (died 1907)
- 1878 – Martin Buber, Austrian-Israeli philosopher and academic (died 1965)
- 1880 – Franz Marc, German soldier and painter (died 1916)
- 1880 – Viktor Schwanneke, German actor and director (died 1931)
- 1882 – Thomas Selfridge, American lieutenant and pilot (died 1908)
- 1883 – Isak Penttala, Finnish politician (died 1955)
- 1883 – Joseph Schumpeter, Czech-American economist and political scientist (died 1950)
- 1884 – Snowy Baker, Australian boxer, rugby player, and actor (died 1953)
- 1886 – Charlie Ruggles, American actor (died 1970)
- 1888 – Edith Evans, English actress (died 1976)
- 1890 – Claro M. Recto, Filipino lawyer, jurist, and politician (died 1960)
- 1893 – Ba Maw, Burmese lawyer and politician, Prime Minister of Burma (died 1977)
- 1894 – King Vidor, American director, producer, and screenwriter (died 1982)
- 1895 – Khorloogiin Choibalsan, Prime Minister of Mongolia (died 1952)
- 1897 – Zakir Husain, Indian academic and politician, 3rd president of India (died 1969)
- 1899 – Lonnie Johnson, American singer-songwriter and guitarist (died 1970)

=== 1901–present ===
- 1902 – Demchugdongrub, Mongol prince and politician, head of state of Mengjiang (died 1966)
- 1903 – Greta Keller, Austrian-American singer and actress (died 1977)
- 1903 – Tunku Abdul Rahman, 1st Prime Minister of Malaysia (died 1990)
- 1906 – Chester Carlson, American physicist and lawyer, invented Xerography (died 1968)
- 1909 – Elisabeth Murdoch, Australian philanthropist (died 2012)
- 1911 – Elizabeth Bishop, American poet and author (died 1979)
- 1913 – Betty Field, American actress (died 1973)
- 1913 – Danai Stratigopoulou, Greek singer-songwriter (died 2009)
- 1914 – Bill Finger, American author and screenwriter, co-created Batman (died 1974)
- 1915 – Georges Guétary, Egyptian-French singer, dancer, and actor (died 1997)
- 1918 – Freddie Blassie, American wrestler and manager (died 2003)
- 1921 – Barney Danson, Canadian colonel and politician, 21st Canadian Minister of National Defence (died 2011)
- 1921 – Nexhmije Hoxha, Albanian politician (died 2020)
- 1921 – Balram Singh Rai, Guyanese politician, 1st Minister of Home Affairs (died 2022)
- 1921 – Lana Turner, American actress (died 1995)
- 1922 – Audrey Meadows, American actress and banker (died 1996)
- 1925 – Jack Lemmon, American actor (died 2001)
- 1926 – Neal Cassady, American author and poet (died 1968)
- 1926 – Birgitte Reimer, Danish film actress (died 2021)
- 1930 – Alejandro Rey, Argentinian-American actor and director (died 1987)
- 1931 – James Dean, American actor (died 1955)
- 1931 – Shadia, Egyptian actress and singer (died 2017)
- 1932 – Cliff Allison, English racing driver and businessman (died 2005)
- 1932 – John Williams, American pianist, composer, and conductor
- 1933 – Elly Ameling, Dutch soprano
- 1937 – Joe Raposo, American pianist and composer (died 1989)
- 1937 – Harry Wu, Chinese human rights activist (died 2016)
- 1939 – Jose Maria Sison, Filipino activist and theorist (died 2022)
- 1940 – Sophie Lihau-Kanza, Congolese politician (died 1999)
- 1940 – Ted Koppel, English-American journalist
- 1941 – Nick Nolte, American actor and producer
- 1941 – Tom Rush, American singer-songwriter, guitarist, and producer
- 1941 – Jagjit Singh, Indian singer-songwriter (died 2011)
- 1942 – Robert Klein, American comedian, actor, and singer
- 1942 – Terry Melcher, American singer-songwriter and producer (died 2004)
- 1943 – Creed Bratton, American actor and musician
- 1943 – Valerie Thomas, American scientist and inventor
- 1944 – Roger Lloyd-Pack, English actor (died 2014)
- 1944 – Sebastião Salgado, Brazilian photographer and journalist (died 2025)
- 1948 – Dan Seals, American singer-songwriter and guitarist (died 2009)
- 1949 – Brooke Adams, American actress, producer, and screenwriter
- 1949 – Niels Arestrup, French actor, director, and screenwriter
- 1952 – Marinho Chagas, Brazilian footballer and coach (died 2014)
- 1953 – Mary Steenburgen, American actress
- 1955 – John Grisham, American lawyer and author
- 1955 – Jim Neidhart, American wrestler (died 2018)
- 1956 – Marques Johnson, American basketball player and sportscaster
- 1957 – Karine Chemla, French historian of mathematics and sinologist
- 1958 – Sherri Martel, American wrestler and manager (died 2007)
- 1958 – Marina Silva, Brazilian environmentalist and politician
- 1959 – Henry Czerny, Canadian actor
- 1959 – Heinz Gunthardt, Swiss tennis player
- 1959 – Andrew Hoy, Australian equestrian rider
- 1959 – Mauricio Macri, Argentinian businessman and politician, President of Argentina
- 1960 – Benigno Aquino III, Filipino politician, 15th President of the Philippines (died 2021)
- 1960 – Dino Ciccarelli, Canadian ice hockey player
- 1961 – Vince Neil, American singer-songwriter and actor
- 1963 – Mohammad Azharuddin, Indian cricketer and politician
- 1964 – Arlie Petters, Belizean-American mathematical physicist and academic
- 1964 – Santosh Sivan, Indian director, cinematographer, producer, and actor
- 1964 – Trinny Woodall, English fashion designer and author
- 1966 – Kirk Muller, Canadian ice hockey player and coach
- 1966 – Hristo Stoichkov, Bulgarian footballer and manager
- 1967 – Adelir Antônio de Carli, Brazilian priest and balloonist
- 1967 – Michael Ansley, American basketball player
- 1968 – Gary Coleman, American actor (died 2010)
- 1969 – Pauly Fuemana, New Zealand-Australian singer-songwriter and guitarist (died 2010)
- 1969 – Mary Robinette Kowal, American puppeteer and author
- 1969 – Mary McCormack, American actress and producer
- 1970 – Stephanie Courtney, American actress and comedian
- 1970 – John Filan, Australian footballer and coach
- 1970 – Alonzo Mourning, American basketball player and executive
- 1971 – Aidy Boothroyd, English footballer and manager
- 1971 – Mika Karppinen, Swedish-Finnish drummer and songwriter
- 1971 – Susan Misner, American actress
- 1972 – Big Show, American wrestler and actor
- 1973 – Michelle Brogan, Australian basketball player
- 1974 – Guy-Manuel de Homem-Christo, French musician, singer, composer, and record producer
- 1974 – Seth Green, American actor, voice artist, comedian, producer, writer, and director
- 1974 – Joshua Morrow, American actor
- 1974 – Kimbo Slice, Bahamian-American mixed martial artist (died 2016)
- 1976 – Khaled Mashud, Bangladeshi cricketer
- 1976 – Nicolas Vouilloz, French rally driver and mountain biker
- 1977 – Dave Farrell, American musician and songwriter
- 1977 – Roman Kostomarov, Russian ice dancer
- 1978 – Ranveer Brar, Indian chef, author, restauranteur, and television personality
- 1978 – Mick de Brenni, Australian politician
- 1979 – Aaron Cook, American baseball player
- 1980 – William Jackson Harper, American actor
- 1981 – Steve Gohouri, Ivorian footballer (died 2015)
- 1981 – Myriam Montemayor Cruz, Mexican singer
- 1981 – Jim Parrack, American actor
- 1983 – Jermaine Anderson, Canadian basketball player
- 1983 – Cory Jane, New Zealand rugby player
- 1984 – Sean Bergenheim, Finnish ice hockey player
- 1984 – Cecily Strong, American actress
- 1984 – Panagiotis Vasilopoulos, Greek basketball player
- 1985 – Petra Cetkovská, Czech tennis player
- 1985 – Jeremy Davis, American bass player and songwriter
- 1985 – Félix Pie, Dominican baseball player
- 1985 – Brian Randle, American basketball player and coach
- 1986 – Anderson .Paak, American singer, songwriter, rapper, and record producer
- 1987 – Javi García, Spanish footballer
- 1987 – Carolina Kostner, Italian figure skater
- 1988 – Keegan Meth, Zimbabwean cricketer
- 1989 – Zac Guildford, New Zealand rugby player
- 1989 – JaJuan Johnson, American basketball player
- 1989 – Julio Jones, American football player
- 1989 – Brendan Smith, Canadian ice hockey player
- 1989 – Courtney Vandersloot, American-Hungarian basketball player
- 1990 – Bethany Hamilton, American surfer
- 1990 – Klay Thompson, American basketball player
- 1991 – Nam Woo-hyun, South Korean singer
- 1992 – Bruno Martins Indi, Portuguese-Dutch footballer
- 1994 – Hakan Çalhanoğlu, Turkish footballer
- 1994 – Nikki Yanofsky, Canadian singer-songwriter
- 1995 – Gabriel Deck, Argentine basketball player
- 1995 – Joshua Kimmich, German footballer
- 1996 – Kenedy, Brazilian footballer
- 1996 – Leighton Vander Esch, American football player
- 1997 – Kathryn Newton, American actress
- 1998 – Rui Hachimura, Japanese basketball player
- 1999 – Alessia Russo, English footballer
- 2001 – I.N, South Korean singer

== Deaths ==
=== Pre-1600 ===
- 538 – Severus of Antioch, patriarch of Antioch (born 465)
- 1204 – Alexios IV Angelos, Byzantine emperor (born 1182)
- 1229 – Ali ibn Hanzala, sixth Dāʿī al-Muṭlaq of Tayyibi Isma'ilism
- 1250 – Robert I, Count of Artois (born 1216)
- 1250 – William II Longespée, Earl of Salisbury, English martyr (born 1212)
- 1265 – Hulagu Khan, Mongol ruler (born 1217)
- 1285 – Theodoric of Landsberg (born 1242)
- 1296 – Przemysł II of Poland (born 1257)
- 1314 – Helen of Anjou, Queen of Serbia (born 1236)
- 1382 – Blanche of France, Duchess of Orléans (born 1328)
- 1537 – Saint Gerolamo Emiliani, Italian humanitarian (born 1481)
- 1599 – Robert Rollock, Scottish theologian and academic (born 1555)

=== 1601–1900 ===
- 1676 – Alexis of Russia (born 1629)
- 1696 – Ivan V of Russia (born 1666)
- 1709 – Giuseppe Torelli, Italian violinist and composer (born 1658)
- 1725 – Peter the Great, Russian emperor (born 1672)
- 1749 – Jan van Huysum, Dutch painter (born 1682)
- 1750 – Aaron Hill, English playwright and poet (born 1685)
- 1772 – Princess Augusta of Saxe-Gotha, Princess of Wales (born 1719)
- 1849 – François Habeneck, French violinist and conductor (born 1781)
- 1849 – France Prešeren, Slovenian poet and lawyer (born 1800)
- 1856 – Agostino Bassi, Italian entomologist and academic (born 1773)

=== 1901–present ===
- 1907 – Hendrik Willem Bakhuis Roozeboom, Dutch chemist and academic (born 1854)
- 1910 – Hans Jæger, Norwegian philosopher and activist (born 1854)
- 1915 – François Langelier, Canadian journalist, lawyer, and politician, 10th Lieutenant Governor of Quebec (born 1838)
- 1921 – George Formby Sr, English actor and singer (born 1876)
- 1921 – Peter Kropotkin, Russian zoologist, geographer, and philologist (born 1842)
- 1928 – Theodor Curtius, German chemist (born 1857)
- 1932 – Yordan Milanov, Bulgarian architect, designed the Sveti Sedmochislenitsi Church (born 1867)
- 1935 – Eemil Nestor Setälä, Finnish linguist and politician, Minister for Foreign Affairs (born 1864)
- 1936 – Charles Curtis, American lawyer and politician, 31st Vice President of the United States (born 1860)
- 1938 – Olga Taratuta, Ukrainian Jewish anarchist (born 1876)
- 1945 – Italo Santelli, Italian fencer and coach (born 1866)
- 1956 – Connie Mack, American baseball player and manager (born 1862)
- 1957 – Walther Bothe, German physicist and academic, Nobel Prize laureate (born 1891)
- 1957 – John von Neumann, Hungarian-American mathematician and physicist (born 1903)
- 1959 – William J. Donovan, American head of the Office of Strategic Services (OSS) (born 1883)
- 1960 – J. L. Austin, English philosopher and academic (born 1911)
- 1960 – Giles Gilbert Scott, English architect and engineer, designed the Red telephone box and Liverpool Cathedral (born 1880)
- 1963 – George Dolenz, Italian-American actor (born 1908)
- 1964 – Ernst Kretschmer, German psychiatrist and author (born 1888)
- 1970 – Cahir Healy, Northern Irish republican and anti partition politician (born 1877)
- 1971 – Kanaiyalal Munshi, Indian independence movement activist, politician, writer and educationist (born 1887)
- 1972 – Markos Vamvakaris, Greek singer-songwriter and bouzouki player (born 1905)
- 1975 – Robert Robinson, English chemist and academic, Nobel Prize laureate (born1886)
- 1977 – Eivind Groven, Norwegian composer and theorist (born 1901)
- 1979 – Dennis Gabor, Hungarian-English physicist and engineer, Nobel Prize laureate (born 1900)
- 1980 – Nikos Xilouris, Greek singer-songwriter (born 1936)
- 1982 – John Hay Whitney, American financier and diplomat, United States Ambassador to the United Kingdom (born 1904)
- 1985 – William Lyons, English businessman, co-founded Swallow Sidecar Company (born 1901)
- 1987 – Harriet E. MacGibbon, American actress (born 1905)
- 1990 – Del Shannon, American singer-songwriter and guitarist (born 1934)
- 1990 – Ernest Titterton, British Australian nuclear physicist (born 1916)
- 1992 – Stanley Armour Dunham, American sergeant (born 1918)
- 1994 – Raymond Scott, American pianist and composer (born 1908)
- 1996 – Del Ennis, American baseball player (born 1925)
- 1997 – Corey Scott, American motorcycle stunt rider (born 1968)
- 1998 – Halldór Laxness, Icelandic author, poet, and playwright, Nobel Prize laureate (born 1902)
- 1998 – Enoch Powell, English soldier and politician, Secretary of State for Health (born 1912)
- 1998 – Julian Simon, American economist and author (born 1932)
- 1999 – Iris Murdoch, Irish-born British novelist and philosopher (born 1919)
- 2000 – Sid Abel, Canadian-American ice hockey player, coach, and sportscaster (born 1918)
- 2000 – Derrick Thomas, American football player (born 1967)
- 2001 – Ivo Caprino, Norwegian director and screenwriter (born 1920)
- 2002 – Ong Teng Cheong, Singaporean architect and politician, 5th President of Singapore (born 1936)
- 2004 – Julius Schwartz, American journalist and author (born 1915)
- 2005 – A. Chandranehru, Sri Lankan sailor and politician (born 1944)
- 2006 – Elton Dean, English saxophonist, songwriter, and producer (born 1945)
- 2006 – Thierry Fortineau, French actor (born 1953)
- 2006 – Akira Ifukube, Japanese composer (born 1914)
- 2007 – Anna Nicole Smith, American model and actress (born 1967)
- 2007 – Ian Stevenson, Canadian-American psychiatrist and academic (born 1918)
- 2008 – Ruby Garrard Woodson, American educator and cultural historian (born 1931)
- 2010 – John Murtha, American colonel and politician (born 1932)
- 2011 – Tony Malinosky, American baseball player and soldier (born 1909)
- 2012 – Wando, Brazilian singer-songwriter (born 1945)
- 2012 – Luis Alberto Spinetta, Argentinian singer-songwriter (born 1950)
- 2013 – Giovanni Cheli, Italian cardinal (born 1918)
- 2013 – James DePreist, American conductor and educator (born 1936)
- 2013 – Maureen Dragone, American journalist and author (born 1920)
- 2013 – Nevin Scrimshaw, American scientist (born 1918)
- 2014 – Els Borst, Dutch physician and politician, Deputy Prime Minister of the Netherlands (born 1932)
- 2014 – Maicon Pereira de Oliveira, Brazilian footballer (born 1988)
- 2014 – Nancy Holt, American sculptor and painter (born 1938)
- 2015 – Rauni-Leena Luukanen-Kilde, Finnish physician and parapsychologist (born 1939)
- 2016 – Amelia Bence, Argentine actress (born 1914)
- 2016 – Nida Fazli, Indian poet and songwriter (born 1938)
- 2016 – Margaret Forster, English historian, author, and critic (born 1938)
- 2016 – Violette Verdy, French ballerina (born 1933)
- 2017 – Peter Mansfield, English physicist, Nobel laureate (born 1933)
- 2017 – Rina Matsuno, Japanese idol singer (born 1998)
- 2017 – Alan Simpson, English scriptwriter (born 1929)
- 2020 – Robert Conrad, American actor (born 1935)
- 2021 – Marty Schottenheimer, American football player and coach (born 1943)
- 2021 – Mary Wilson, American singer (born 1944)
- 2023 – Arto Heiskanen, Finnish professional hockey player (born 1963)
- 2025 – Dick Jauron, American football player and coach (born 1950)
- 2025 – Sam Nujoma, Namibian politician, 1st President of Namibia (born 1929)
- 2025 – Gyalo Thondup, Brother of the 14th Dalai Lama (born 1928)

== Holidays and observances ==
- Christian feast day:
  - Cuthmann of Steyning
  - Elffled of Whitby
  - Elisabetta Martinez
  - Gerolamo Emiliani
  - Josephine Bakhita
  - Juventius of Pavia
  - Mengold of Huy
  - Stephen of Muret
  - February 8 (Eastern Orthodox liturgics)
- Parinirvana Day (some Mahayana Buddhism traditions; most celebrate on February 15)
- Prešeren Day (Slovenia)
- Propose Day (India)
- Military Foundation Day (North Korea)
