= February 8 (Eastern Orthodox liturgics) =

Day in the Eastern Orthodox liturgical calendar

Eastern Orthodox liturgical calendar
February 7	February 8	February 9
February 8 O.S. ≍ February 21 N.S. February 8 N.S ≍ January 26 O.S.

An Eastern Orthodox cross

February 8 in Eastern Orthodox liturgical calendars is a feast day and a day of commemoration of saints and martyrs. Although some Orthodox churches use the Revised Julian Calendar and others use the traditional Julian calendar, the fixed commemorations for their respective February 8 are broadly the same, no matter which calendar is used. (Note: Despite the dates being the same, the days to which they refer typically differ by 13 days. The notation Old Style or O.S. is sometimes used to indicate a date in the traditional Julian Calendar (the "Old Calendar"). The notation New Style or N.S, indicates a date in the Revised Julian calendar (the "New Calendar").)

== Feasts ==
- Afterfeast of the Meeting of our Lord in the Temple.

== Saints ==
- Prophet Zechariah, of the Twelve Minor Prophets (520 BC)
- Virgin-martyrs Martha and Mary, sisters, and the monk Lukarion, martyrs by crucifixion. (Note: The prefect ordered that they be put to death by crucifixion. The soldiers nailed the martyrs on crosses. The pagans who were present admired their youthful bravery and valor. Then the prefect ordered his executioners to behead them. Thus the two sisters Martha and Mary and the monk-martyr Lucarios delivered their souls into the hand of the Lord and received from Him crowns of glory.) (see also February 6 - Slavic)
- Martyrs Nicephorus and Stephen.
- Martyr Pergetos.
- Great martyr Theodore Stratelates "the General" of Heraclea (319)
- Saint Agathangelus, Bishop of Damascus (c. 325) (Note: The Greek Synaxarion states that he lived in the 3rd century.)
- Venerable ascetics Philadelphus and Polycarp, monastics, reposed in peace.

== Pre-Schism Western saints ==
- Saint Juventius of Pavia, Bishop of Pavia (1st century) (Note: The tradition is that St Hermagoras, Bishop of Aquileia and disciple of the Apostle Mark, sent Sts Syrus and Juventius to preach the Gospel in Pavia in Italy where the latter became the first bishop.)
- Martyrs Paul, Lucius and Cyriacus, in Rome.
- Martyr Cointha (Conitus) of Alexandria (249) (Note: "At Alexandria, under the emperor Decius, the martyr St. Cointha, whom the Pagans seized, led to the idols and urged to adore them. As she refused with horror, they put her feet in chains, and dragged her through the streets of the city, mangling her body in a barbarous manner.")
- Saints Jacut and Guethenoc, disciples of St Budoc, they were driven from Britain to Brittany (5th century) (Note: See: Saint-Jacut-de-la-Mer.)
- Saint Honoratus of Milan, Bishop of Milan and Confessor (570) (Note: Appointed Bishop of Milan in Italy in 567, at a time when much trouble was caused by Arianism and the Lombard invasion. He was driven out of Milan by barbarians.)
- Saint Kewe (Kigwe, Ciwa), a saint venerated in Gwent in Wales.
- Saint Oncho (Onchuo), a pilgrim, poet, and guardian of holy relics and the Celtic tradition (c. 600) (Note: While searching for memorials of the saints, he reposed at Clonmore monastery in Ireland and his body was enshrined there together with the relics which he had gathered.)
- Saint Nicetius of Besançon (Nizier), Bishop of Besançon in France and a friend of St Columbanus of Luxeuil (611) (Note: He restored the episcopal see to Besançon after it had been transferred to Nyon on Lake Geneva after the invasion of the Huns.)
- Saint Paulus of Verdun, Bishop of Verdun, renowned for miracles (c. 649) (Note: A courtier who became a hermit on Mt Voge (now Paulberg) near Trier in Germany. Later he became a monk at the monastery of Tholey and then Bishop of Verdun in France.)
- Saint Ælfflæd of Whitby (Elfleda), Abbess of Whitby Abbey (714) (Note: Daughter of Oswy, King of Northumbria in England. She was offered to God as a child at the convent of Hartlepool. She then went to Whitby with St Hilda and succeeded her mother Enfleda as abbess there. She was one of the most influential people of her time.)
- Saint Cuthmann of Steyning, a confessor who lived a holy life as a shepherd near Steyning in Sussex in England (8th century)
- Saint Mlada (Mileda, Mary), a Benedictine abbess and founder of the first monastery in Bohemia (994) (Note: Daughter of Boleslav, Duke of Bohemia. She founded the convent of St George in Prague.)
- Saint Meingold of Huy, a holy man who lived in Huy on the Meuse and was venerated in Belgium (10th century) (Note: "S. Mengold, second patron of the town of Huy on the Meuse, where a church is erected under his invocation, was count of Huy, and was murdered by some knights of his court, whose vices he attempted to restrain. His relics, along with those of several other saints of Huy, are preserved in the noble church of Our Lady in that town.")

== Post-Schism Orthodox saints ==
- Saint Sabbas II, Archbishop of Serbia (1271)
- Saint Makarios, Bishop of Paphos on Cyprus (1688)
- Saint Lyubov of Ryazan, Fool-for-Christ (1921) (Note: See: (in Russian) Блаженная Любовь Рязанская. 28 августа 1852 г. - 21 февраля 1921 г.. Рязанской епархии (Official website of the Ryazan Diocese).)

=== New martyrs and confessors ===
- New Hieromartyrs Andrew Dobrynin, Archpriest of Prechistoye-Naumovo, Yaroslavl, and Peter Markov, Archpriest of Korenevo, Moscow (1938)
- New Hieromartyrs Simeon Kulgavets and Sergius Lubomudrov, priests (1938)
- New Hieromartyr Alexander Abissov, Priest (1942)

== Other commemorations ==
- Repose of Schema-Abbot Theodore of Valaam Monastery (1937)

== Icon gallery ==
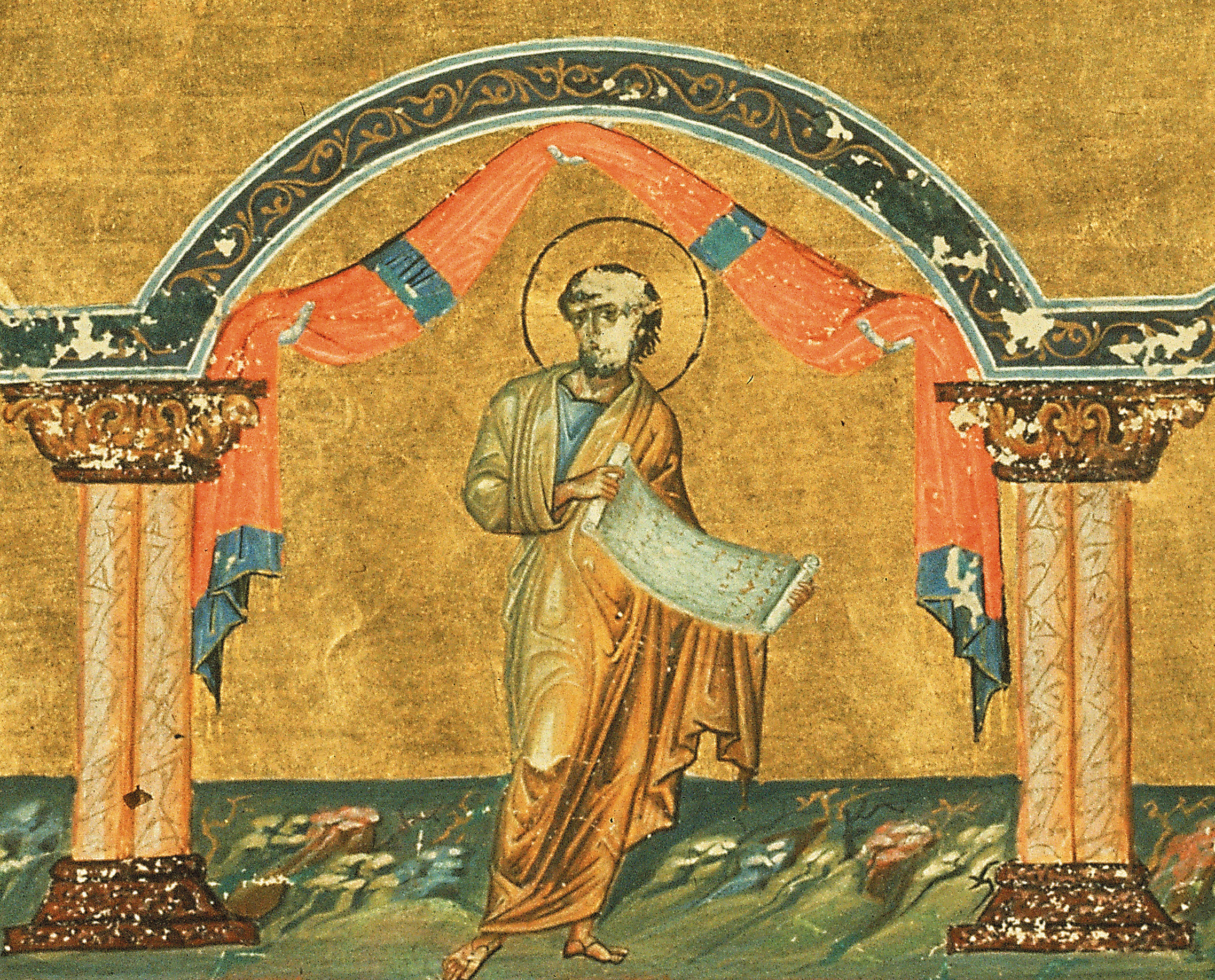
Prophet Zechariah.

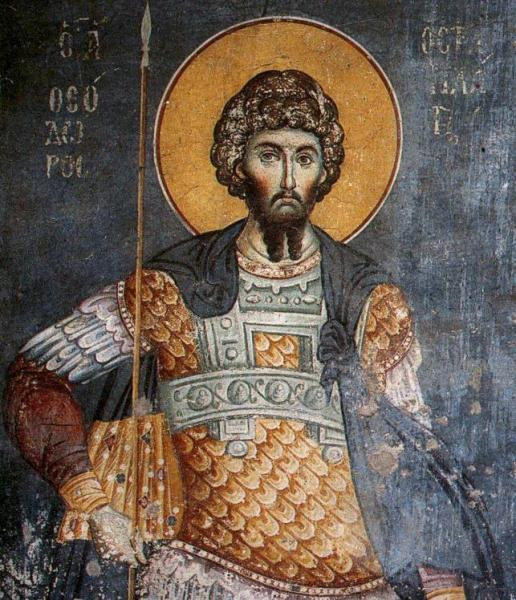
Great martyr Theodore Stratelates "the General" of Heraclea.

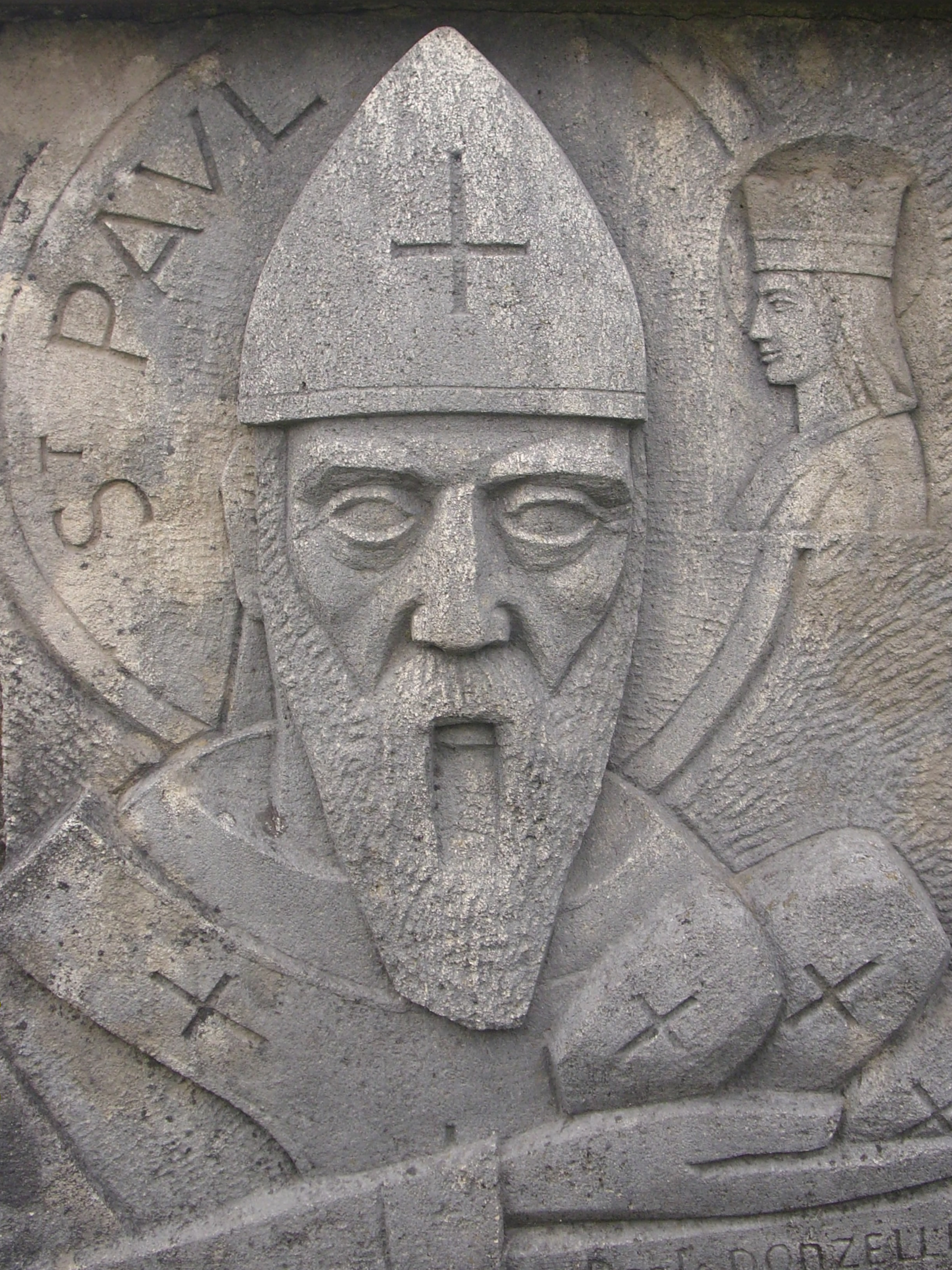
St Paulus of Verdun, distributing rolls from the "Paul Cross" near Verdun.

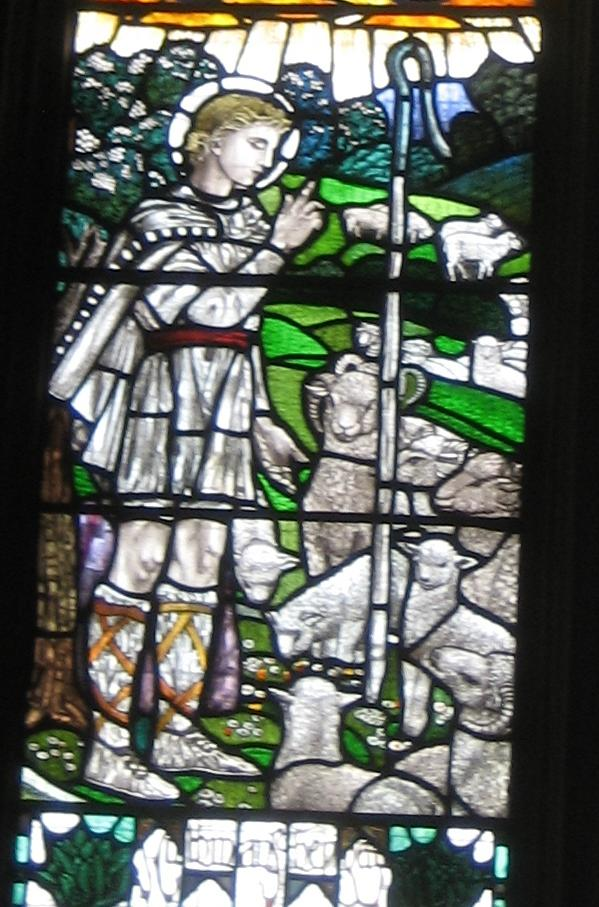
St Cuthmann of Steyning.

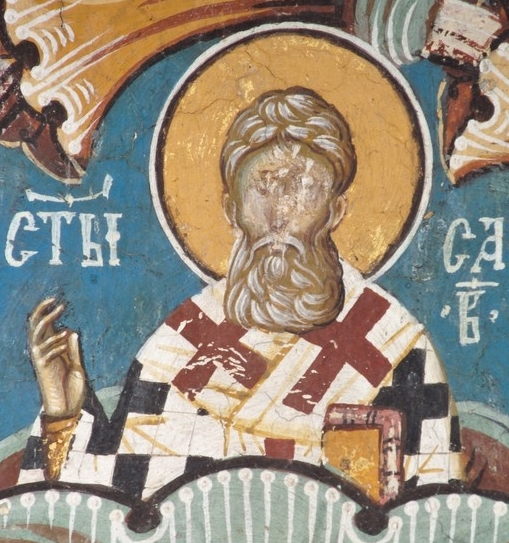
St Sabbas II, Abp of Serbia.

== Sources ==
- February 8 / 21. Orthodox Calendar (Pravoslavie.ru).
- February 21 / 8. Holy Trinity Russian Orthodox Church (A parish of the Patriarchate of Moscow).
- February 8. OCA - The Lives of the Saints.
- The Autonomous Orthodox Metropolia of Western Europe and the Americas. St. Hilarion Calendar of Saints for the year of our Lord 2004. St. Hilarion Press (Austin, TX). p. 13.
- The Eighth Day of the Month of February. Orthodoxy in China.
- February 8. Latin Saints of the Orthodox Patriarchate of Rome.
- The Roman Martyrology. Transl. by the Archbishop of Baltimore. Last Edition, According to the Copy Printed at Rome in 1914. Revised Edition, with the Imprimatur of His Eminence Cardinal Gibbons. Baltimore: John Murphy Company, 1916. pp. 41–42.
- Rev. Richard Stanton. A Menology of England and Wales, or, Brief Memorials of the Ancient British and English Saints Arranged According to the Calendar, Together with the Martyrs of the 16th and 17th Centuries. London: Burns & Oates, 1892. pp. 58–60.

Greek Sources

- Great Synaxaristes: (in Greek) 8 Φεβρουαρίου. Μεγασ Συναξαριστησ.
- (in Greek) Συναξαριστής. 8 Φεβρουαρίου. Ecclesia.gr. (H Εκκλησια Τησ Ελλαδοσ).

Russian Sources

- (in Russian) 21 февраля (8 февраля). Православная Энциклопедия под редакцией Патриарха Московского и всея Руси Кирилла (электронная версия). (Orthodox Encyclopedia - Pravenc.ru).
