= Nicolas Psaume =

Bishop of Verdun and Holy Roman prince

Nicolas Psaume O.Praem
- Prince-Bishop of Verdun
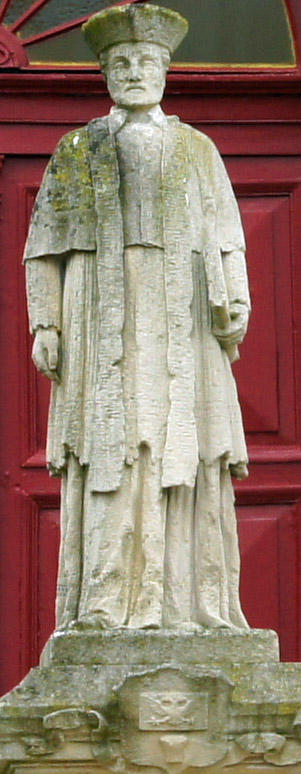
- Church: Catholic Church
- Diocese: Diocese of Verdun
- In office: 13 June 1548 – 10 August 1575
- Predecessor: Nicolas, Duke of Mercœur
- Successor: Nicolas Bousmard

Orders
- Consecration: 26 August 1548 by Jacques Hanot

Personal details
- Born: 11 December 1518 Chaumont-sur-Aire, Duchy of Bar, Holy Roman Empire
- Died: 10 August 1575 (aged 56) Verdun, Prince-Bishopric of Verdun, Three Bishoprics, Kingdom of France

Nicolas Psaume (1518, in Chaumont-sur-Aire – 10 August 1575, in Verdun) was the bishop of Verdun and a prince of the Holy Roman Empire. The Prince-Bishopric of Verdun was then a French-speaking state of the Holy Roman Empire. Nicolas Psaume was originally from the Duchy of Bar.

== Life ==
Having studied classics at the Norbertine Abbey of St Paul at Verdun, of which his uncle, François Psaume, was commendatory abbot, he completed a higher course of studies at the universities of Paris, Orléans, and Poitiers; and then entered the Abbey of St Paul. Ordained priest in 1540, he was sent to the University of Paris, where, after a defence of numerous theses, he won his doctorate of theology. But for the intrigues of François, Cardinal of Pisa, Psaume, who had already been made Abbot of St Paul, Verdun, would have been elected Abbot General of Prémontré, for his nomination had already been confirmed by Francis I, King of France.

In 1546 he was chosen to represent the Norbertine Order at the Council of Trent, but John, Cardinal of Lorraine retained him and, with the pope's consent, resigned the Bishopric of Verdun in favour of Psaume, who was consecrated bishop 26 August 1548. In the following year, he attended the Provincial Council of Trier, and in the same year he published its canons and decrees in his own diocese.

He was also present at the General Council of Trent from May 1551, until its prorogation on 28 April 1552, distinguishing himself by his eloquence and learning and by his zeal in defence of the doctrine and the prerogatives of the Church. He was active in condemning certain abuses, especially those of the commenda. On 2 January 1552, he was charged by the papal legate with the editing of the canons of the council. In 1562, he returned to Trent, where the sessions of the council had been resumed.

To provide a sound education for youth he gave financial assistance to the Jesuits in founding a college at Verdun. He is buried near the altar of the Blessed Sacrament in the Cathedral of Verdun.

== Diary ==
On both occasions at the Council of Trent, Psaume kept a diary of all that passed at the various sessions; it was printed at Paris (1564–80), at Reims and at Verdun in the same year. Hugo, the annalist of the order, also edited it in two parts, but much was left out in the second part. Hugo's "Collectio" was edited by Le Plat in the fifth volume of his "Monumenta Conc. Tridentin." The parts omitted are supplied by Ignaz von Döllinger, "Ungedruckte Berichte u. Tagebücher z. Geschichte d. Konzils v. Trient", II (Nördlingen, 1876), p. 172.

== Other works ==
Psaume was also requested by the Archbishops of Reims and Trier to co-ordinate French ecclesiastical legislation and make it agree with the canons and decrees of the Council of Trent. He wrote much in defence of the Catholic doctrine against the Anglicans, Calvinists and Lutherans.

== See also ==
- Three Bishoprics
- Duchy of Bar
