= Bishopric of Verdun =

Bishopric of Verdun may refer to:

- Roman Catholic Diocese of Verdun, the spiritual jurisdiction of the bishops of Verdun
- Prince-Bishopric of Verdun, the secular jurisdiction of the bishops of Verdun in the Holy Roman Empire
