= Adalgisel Grimo =

Adalgisel Grimo (died after 634) was a deacon and member of the Austrasian nobility. He is chiefly significant because of his will, dated 30 December 634. This is the oldest known early medieval deed for the territory between the Meuse and the Rhine and contains important information about the settlement, constitutional, economic and social history of this region.

Adalgisel Grimo had a double name, such as appears occasionally in early medieval sources. Grimo is the diminutive of a longer polysyllabic name. He was educated at the Cathedral of Verdun, served as a deacon under Bishop Paulus of Verdun, and founded Tholey Abbey. He controlled a large territory between the Meuse and Rhine, which he bequeathed to St. Maximin's Abbey, Trier and the Monastery of Longuyon, among others.

His will provides information regarding his family relationships. His sister was a deacon named Ermengundis. He mentions that his aunt, whose name is not given, is buried in the church of Saint-George in Amay. In 1977 the gravestone of Saint Chrodoara was found in this church. Chrodoara was married to a duke named Bodegisel, a member of a north Aquitanian aristocratic family. This helped confirm previous assumptions about the membership of Adalgisel in this family whose members are identifiable by names ending in "-gisil".

A 10th-century transcription of the Latin testament of Adalgisel Grimo resides in the State Archives in Koblenz (Rhineland-Palatinate). The definitive edition of the text was presented in 1932 by Wilhelm Levison.
