= Manegold of Lautenbach =

Manegold of Lautenbach (c. 1030 – c. 1103) was a religious and polemical writer and Augustinian canon from Alsace, active mostly as a teacher in south-west Germany. William of Champeaux may have been one of his pupils, but this is disputed. He was one of the first magisters, recognised masters of theology.

== Life ==
He engaged in a controversy with Wenrich of Trier, taking the papal side in the era of the Investiture Controversy. He also attacked Wolfhelm of Brauweiler.

According to Richard of Poitiers, Manegold "was learned beyond all his contemporaries in letters divine and secular" and his wife and daughters were also learned in the Scriptures. His daughters had students of their own.

Towards the end of his life (1094) he was a reformer at the religious community at Marbach.

== Writings ==
His Ad Gebehardum liber of 1085 was a comprehensive discussion of kingship, original and much commented on, and clarifying some of the political arguments most centrally used by the papal supporters; it argued that kingship was an office from which the king could be deposed; his functionalist analogy was with the position of swineherd, held at the pleasure of the employer. This work, dedicated to Gebhard, archbishop of Salzburg, was intended to refute a polemic letter of Wenrich on behalf of Emperor Henry IV, written c.1080-1. A strong supporter of Pope Gregory VII, and the Gregorian revolutionary reforms, Manegold shared with others of his time the view in political thought that secular rulers held their power on the basis of some kind of pact with the ruled. Further, when the pact could be considered broken, the oath of allegiance could be considered null, a theory of resistance adapted to aristocratic arguments that had not long previously been topical in Saxony; this theory had been documented in the 1082 Bellum Saxonicum of Bruno of Merseburg. The argument that in the past bad kings had frequently been deposed, typically with papal involvement, derived from a papal letter of 1075 to Hermann, bishop of Metz.

Manegold's book also contained an account of the life of Gregory VII, reflecting the Vita by John the Deacon of Gregory the Great; this shares details with chronicles of Berthold of Reichenau and Bernold of St Blasien, writing in the part of southern Germany in which Manegold had sheltered after having to leave Alsace. Manegold's sources included St Paul, Jerome, Peter Damian and Bernold; also Pseudo-Chrysostom's Opus Imperfectum in Matthaeum, for the way the 'pact' theory was expressed. Along with others arguing from the same side, he used arguments from Cyprian, De unitate ecclesiae, in a version (of the fourth chapter) supporting papal primacy.

He opposed the uncritical acceptance by Christians of the views of pagan classical writers. He was a critic of Macrobius, singling out for attack in geography the spherical Earth theory of four isolated continents of Crates of Mallus, on theological grounds.

=== List ===
- Ad Gebehardum liber
- Ad Wibaldum Abbatem
- De psalmorum libro exegesis
- Contra Wolfelmum Coloniensem
