= Joseph de Metz-Noblat =

French Roman Catholic bishop (born 1959)

- Bishop of Verdun
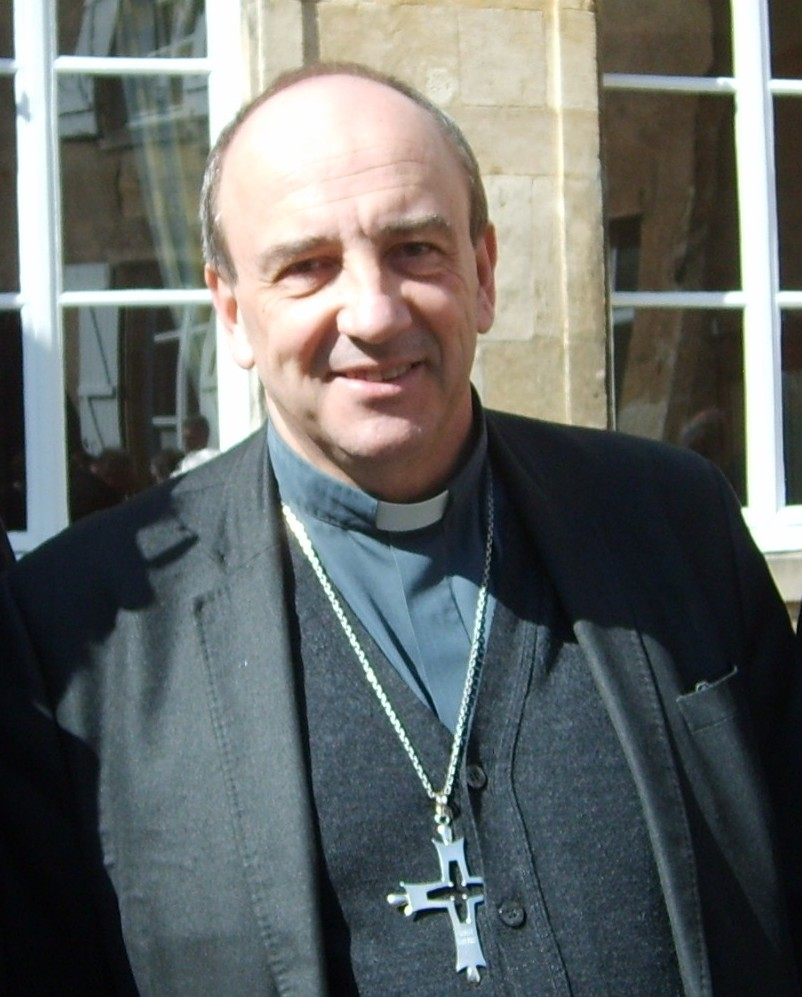
- Church: Catholic Church
- See: Verdun
- Appointed: 11 April 2026
- Installed: 6 June 2026
- Predecessor: Jean-Paul Gusching
- Previous post: Bishop of Langres (2014–2026)

Orders
- Ordination: 28 May 1987
- Consecration: 16 March 2014 by Thierry Jordan

Personal details
- Born: Joseph-Marie-Edouard de Metz-Noblat; 6 February 1959 (age 67) Cherbourg, France
- Education: Nancy 2 University; Catholic University of Paris
- Motto: Gardez confiance (Keep the faith)
- Coat of arms: Joseph de Metz-Noblat's coat of arms

Joseph-Marie-Edouard de Metz-Noblat (born 6 February 1959) is a French Catholic prelate who has served as the Bishop of Verdun since 2026. He was previously Bishop of Langres from 2014 to 2026.

== Early life ==
Joseph de Metz-Noblat was born on 6 February 1959 in Cherbourg to Jacques, a frigate captain, and Louise. He attended Lycée Notre-Dame Saint-Sigisbert in Nancy and ESTIC in Saint-Dizier. From 1976 to 1980, he completed a bachelor's degree in civil law at Nancy 2 University, before entering the major seminary in Metz.

== Presbyterate ==
On 28 May 1987, de Metz-Noblat was ordained a priest for the Diocese of Verdun. Alongside various parish appointments at Saint-Mihiel, Commercy, Triaucourt, and Rembercourt, de Metz-Noblat directed vocation ministry from 1990 to 2001 and youth ministry from 1999 to 2005. He also studied at the Catholic University of Paris, where he earned a Licentiate of Canon Law. From 2000 to 2005, de Metz-Noblat was parish priest in Verdun. He served as the diocesan vicar general from 2011.

== Episcopate ==
On 21 January 2014, Pope Francis appointed de Metz-Noblat to be the Bishop of Langres. He was consecrated on 16 March 2014 at the Langres Cathedral by Archbishop of Reims Thierry Jordan, with François Maupu and Renauld de Dinechin as co-consecrators. During his time as Bishop of Langres, de Metz-Noblat opened the cause for canonisation of Mother Marie Adèle Garnier, the foundress of the Tyburn Nuns.

After serving as Bishop of Langres for twelve years, de Metz-Noblat was appointed Bishop of Verdun by Pope Leo XIV on 11 April 2026. His installation Mass took place on 6 June 2026 at the Verdun Cathedral.
