= Wenrich =

Wenrich may refer to:

- Wenrich of Trier (eleventh century), a German ecclesiastico-political writer
- Bart Wenrich, American television producer
- Percy Wenrich (1880–1952), an American composer of ragtime and popular music
