= Theoderic (bishop of Verdun) =

Theoderic, or Thierry, was a royalist bishop of Verdun from 1047 to 1089. Before his consecration, he was a chaplain of Henry III .

He sided with Henry III during the rebellion of Godfrey the Bearded, which led to significant destruction in Verdun by the latter.

In 1073, he had problems with the Abbey of St.Mihiel, probably instigated by Sophie, Countess of Bar. He placed it under an interdict, a sentence he maintained even after an intervention by the Pope Gregory VII.

During the reign of Henry IV, even if he did not attend the Synod of Worms in 1076, and fled Utrecht later that year to avoid witnessing the excommunication of Pope Gregory VII by bishop William of Utrecht, he was identified with the King's side from the beginning of the Investiture Controversy.

He acknowledged his rebellion, and asked for forgiveness, by sending abbot Rudolf of Saint Vanne to the Pope, with his ring and stole as tokens of submission. However, he attended Henry IV's court in Speyer and he attempted to travel to Italy in his service, early in 1077, but was made prisoner by count Adalbert of Calw, who extracted a ransom from him. He was the King's envoy, and plead the King's case with Benno II of Osnabrück, at the Lenten synod of 1078 in Rome, and managed to keep the Pope neutral in the conflict between Henry and the anti-king Rudolph. In 1079, he was the only bishop to support Egilbert, Henry's candidate to the Archbishopric of Trier, which was finally elected. He managed to stay in good relations with both Henry and Gregory until 1079, among other things receiving bishop Hermann of Metz as a guest after his exile by Duke Theodoric of Upper Lotharingia.

After Henry's second excommunication, in the Lenten Synod of 1080, Theoderic went decidedly to the king's side, attending the synod of Mainz, where he renounced his obedience to the Pope. Moreover, in a public letter he called for his deposition. In contrast to 1076, he did not immediately petition for papal forgiveness, and commissioned a polemical work from Wenrich of Trier. Apparently, such actions led the clergy in his diocese to deny him their obedience, and he was deprived of his episcopal and sacerdotal offices. Forced by these events, and especially by the monks of Saint Vanne, he again sent abbot Rudolf to Rome with his ring, stole and resignation. When the war changed course in 1081, he did not wait to receive the absolution, and resumed his offices regardless.

In 1084, when Henry entered Rome and Gregory fled into exile, Theoderic could fully reassert his authority. He exiled the pro-Gregorian monks from Liège that had taken refuge in the city, subjugated the monks of St. Mihiel (even burning the palace at Bar, and led the monks of St. Vanne into exile, led by their abbot Rudolf, a former friend. During that period, he exercised something close to a regency while Henry campaigned in Italy. He negotiated with the Saxon rebels, finally consecrated Egilbert to the archbishopric of Trier, following Henry's orders, and also consecrated Walon, abbot of Saint-Arnould as bishop of Metz, after the deposition of Hermann.

He died in 1085, having before asked the Pope and the community of Saint Vanne for forgiveness.
