= Vitonus =

French monk and bishop

Saint Vitonus
- Died: 525
- Venerated in: Roman Catholic Church
- Canonized: Pre-Congregation
- Feast: November 9
- Patronage: Verdun, France

Saint Vitonus (died 525), also called Vanne or Vaune, became a monk as a young man and was later made Bishop of Verdun by King Clovis I.

== Narrative ==
In the Franco-Roman War of 486, following the decisive Frankish victory at the Battle of Soissons, Verdun refused to yield to the Franks and was besieged by King Clovis I. Firminus, bishop of Verdun, died during the siege. The citizens sent the revered priest Euspicius to treat with the king. After entering the city peacefully, Clovis wished to appoint Euspicius as bishop. He declined, but suggested his nephew, the monk Vitonus, whom Clovis accepted as alternate.

Vitonus converted all the pagan residents in the area, and was known for performing miracles. Legend has it that he drowned a terrible dragon in the Meuse - which is a traditional description for fighting paganism. Vitonus also founded a college for priests. He died about 525 and was buried at the church of Ss. Peter and Paul.

== Veneration ==
Vitonus was venerated as a saint immediately after his death. Vitonus was canonised around 850 by his successor Hatton, when local bishops governed the veneration of holy men and women within their own dioceses.

A church dedicated to him in Verdun was mentioned in documents as early as 701. The Benedictine Abbey of St-Vanne, dedicated to Vitonius, was established on the site in 952; today its ruins are within the city's citadel. In 1147, Pope Eugene III carried out the solemn transfer of Vitonius' bones to the new cathedral. The relics have since been lost. Since 1976, the diocese of Verdun has celebrated his memorial day on 12 October together with an earlier bishop, Saint Sanctinus.
