= Valentine's Week =

Romantic celebration in India

Valentine's Week is a week-long celebration of romantic love that is observed in India each year from February 7 (Rose Day) to 14 February (Valentine's Day). The celebration consists of eight consecutive themed days leading up to Valentine's Day, with each day dedicated to a different aspect of romantic relationships.

== History and Origins ==
Coverage of Valentine's Week in India has highlighted increased marketing and gift-buying in the period leading up to February 14. Reporting has also described the week preceding Valentine's Day as having gained popularity in India.

== The Themed Days ==
The themed days of Valentine's Week are celebrated as follows:

1. February 7 - Rose Day: The week begins with Rose Day, when people exchange roses to symbolise love and affection.
2. February 8 - Propose Day: A day dedicated to proposing to a romantic interest or reaffirming commitment to an existing partner.
3. February 9 - Chocolate Day: Couples exchange chocolates to celebrate the sweetness of their relationship.
4. February 10 - Teddy Day: Partners gift teddy bears as tokens of affection and comfort.
5. February 11 - Promise Day: A day for making commitments and promises to strengthen relationships.
6. February 12 - Hug Day: Celebrated through warm embraces and physical affection.
7. February 13 - Kiss Day: The penultimate day dedicated to intimate gestures between partners.
8. February 14 - Valentine's Day: Final day of the romantic celebrations.

== Cultural Significance ==
Survey reporting shows a substantial share of urban Indians intending to celebrate Valentine's Day. The week-long observance has become a significant cultural phenomenon among younger generations, though it has also faced criticism from some cultural and religious groups.

== See also ==
- Valentine's Day
- Valentine's Day in India
- Contemporary Indian culture
- Propose Day
- Festivals in India
