= Paulus of Verdun =

Bishop of Verdun (576–648)

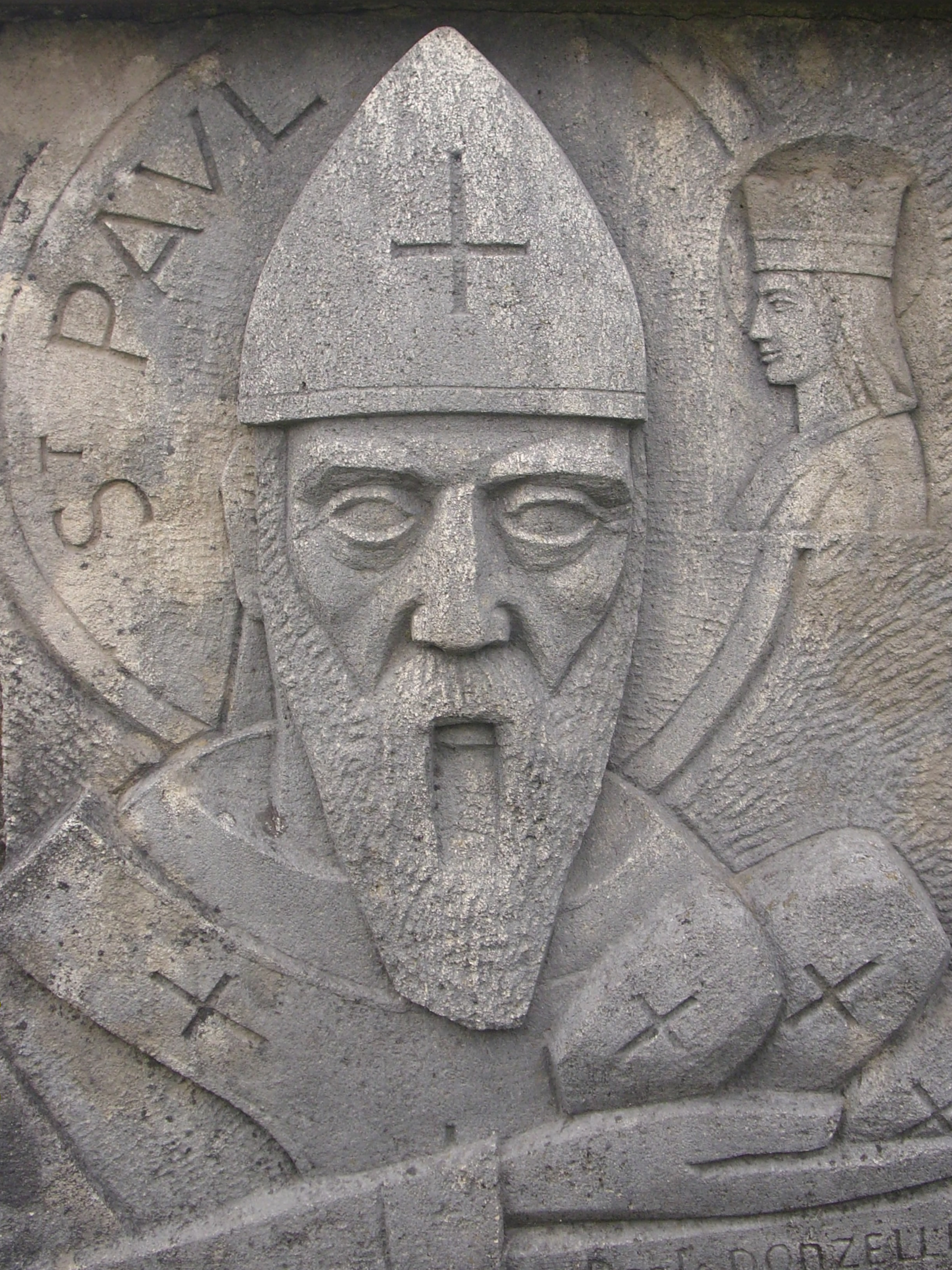
Paul distributing rolls from the "Paul Cross" near Verdun

Paulus of Verdun (576-648) was a bishop of Verdun in the Lorraine region of France from 630 until his death in 647 or 648.

== Life ==
Paulus was the son of a wealthy family – his name suggests that he was part of the old Gallo-Roman aristocracy. According to St Augustine Abbey's Book of Saints, Paulus is said to have been the brother of Saint Germanus of Paris. As a young man he was educated at the court of Chlothar II where he belonged to a small but very influence circle of young boys such as the future king Dagobert I, Desiderius, the later bishop of Cahors, and Eligius, the later advisor of Dagobert I and bishop of Noyon-Tournai according to the letter of Desiderius of Cahors (Epistola I.10).

He became a hermit and spent time on Paulsberg (lat: Mons Cebenna) across the Moselle from Trier, in the Vosges mountains.

Later he joined the monastery at Tholey in what is now Saarland. There he had charge of the school and is said to have become the second abbot. His tenure as abbot continued from 626 to 643/647.

He was named the bishop of Verdun about 630 by King Dagobert I. According to his biography he was made bishop against his will due to the influence of one of his students, Adalgisel Grimo. Reportedly he found the diocese in a very poor financial state and was aided by gifts from Adalgisel and the Frankish King of Austrasia.

After his death Paulus was buried in the church of St. Saturninus in Verdun, which he had built and which was later renamed St. Paul's after him.

Paulus's remains were later translated to a new monastery that was founded by Bishop Viefrid from 970 to 973 and was dedicated to him. The Abbey of Saint-Paul de Verdun was originally occupied by Benedictines, but in 1135 by Premonstratensians, and was finally destroyed in 1552.

His feast day is February 8 in the Roman Catholic and Orthodox Churches.

== Legend ==
According to a legend related by Bertarius of Verdun, one day Paulus was working in the bakery in the Abbey of Tholey when the oven malfunctioned. He feared that the bread would not be ready in time for meals, so he climbed into the burning oven in full habit, cleaned it with his hood, arranged the loaves to be baked, and later emerged from the oven with the fully baked loaves.

Because of this legend, Paulus became the patron saint of bakers and pastry chefs of Verdun. On his feast day the "bread of Saint Paul" was distributed annually on the streets of Verdun.

The Roman Martyrology states that he was renowned for miracles.

== Monuments ==
The Abbey of Saint-Paul de Verdun that was founded by Bishop Viefrid from 970 to 973 was dedicated to him.

In addition, the "Paul-Cross" was erected in stone a few kilometers from Verdun, at a place called "Le Rozelier". The bishop represented there was recognizable as Saint Paulus from the bread rolls that he is holding. The plaque on this monuments reads (in capital letters):

"Les moines de Tholey emportèrent dans leur abbaye sarroise le corps de saint Paul, évêque de Verdun, ancien moine de Tholey (fin de ixe siècle), afin de le soustraire à l'invasion normande. Ici ils furent arrêtés par une force mystérieuse. Une croix fut élevée en ce lieu, dit dès lors Pale Croix ou Paul Croix. L'abbaye Saint-Vanne de Verdun y établit un prieuré au xiie siècle. La croix actuelle et l'autel, qui renferme une relique de saint Paul, ont été bénis par Mgr Petit, évêque de Verdun, le 14 août 1963." (Note: Translation: "The monks of Tholey translated to their abbey in Saarland the relics of Saint Paul, Bishop of Verdun, and former monk of Tholey Abbey, in the late 9th century, in order to evade the Norman invasion. Here they were stopped by a mysterious force. A cross was erected in this place, said to be the Pale Cross or Paul Cross. The abbey of Saint-Vanne de Verdun established a priory there in the 12th century. The current cross and the altar, which contains a relic of St Paul, were blessed by Monseigneur Petit, Bishop of Verdun, on August 14, 1963.")

He is also depicted on a stained glass window in Saint Martin's Church in Les Éparges, a commune in the Meuse department in Lorraine in north-eastern France. The church was built in 1852, destroyed during the First World War, and rebuilt again in 1929. Upon entering the church, the venerable Saint is seen depicted on the third window in the nave, on the right side, holding three bread rolls placed on top of the Gospel.
