= Propose Day =

Entry day of Valentine's day

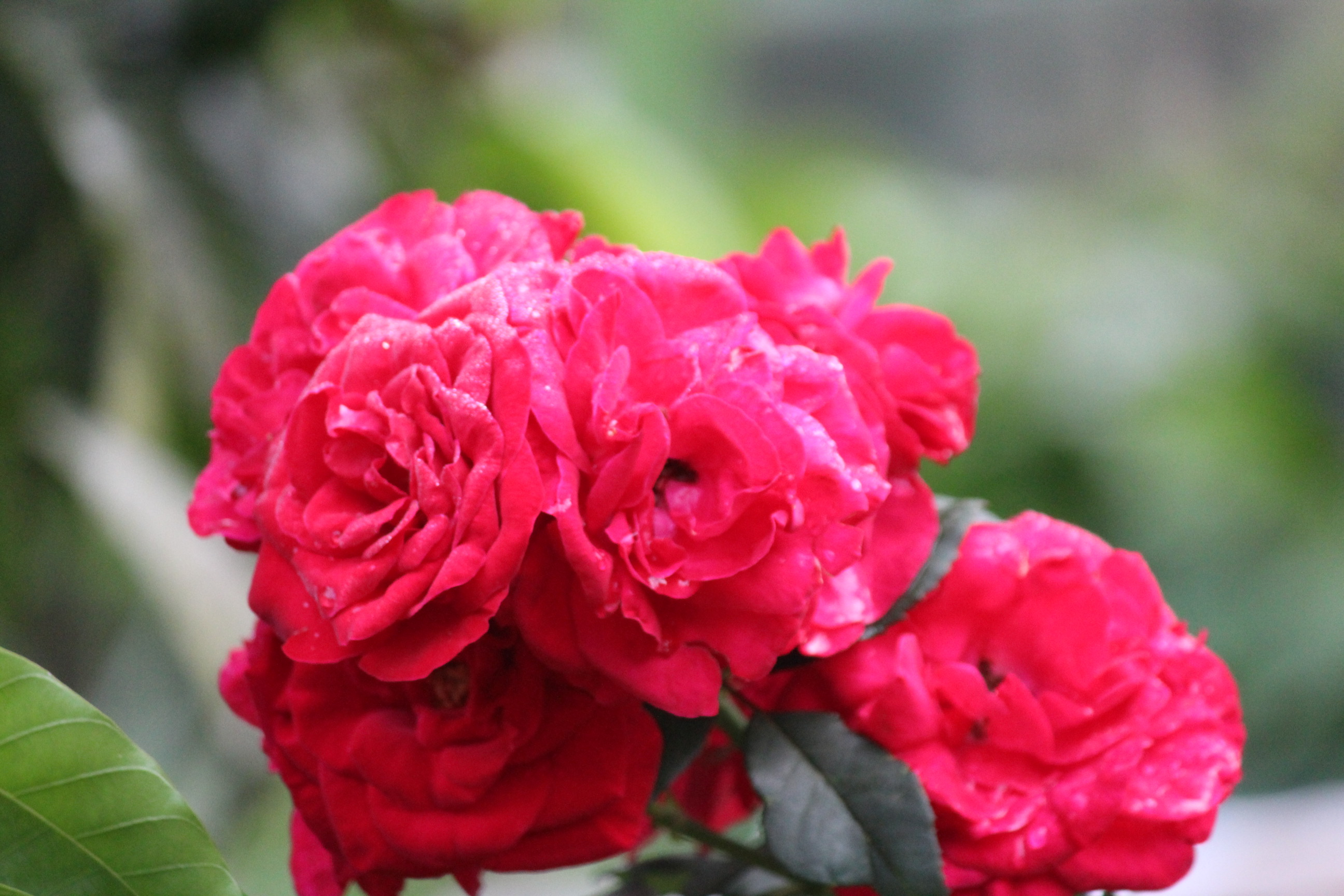
Roses

Propose Day is celebrated in India on 8 February as a day to propose to one's significant other. It is the second day in Valentine's Week. Although Valentine's Day is celebrated across whole world, Valentine's Week is something celebrated in India only. This week marks various festivities across India including Rose Day on the 7th.

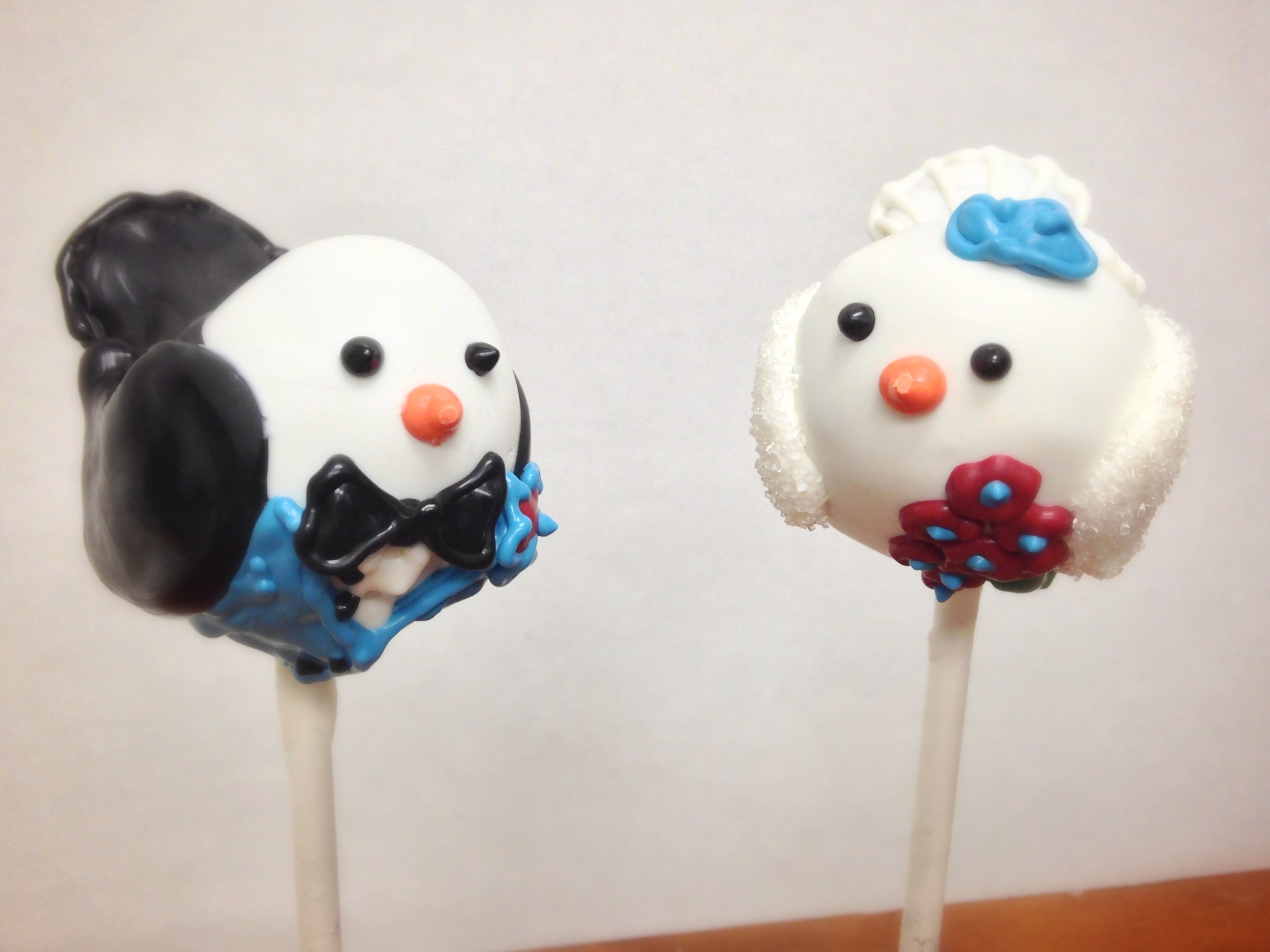
A "couple" of birdy treats

== See also ==
- National Hugging Day
- Valentine's Day
