= Jacques de Révigny =

Jacques de Revigny or Jacobus de Ravanis (1230s-1296) was a French jurist. The Italian jurist and poet Cino da Pistoia said of Jacques de Revigny that there was no cleverer debater in the world.

== Life ==
Born some time between 1230 and 1240, Jacques de Revigny studied law under Jean de Monchy, Guichard de Langres and Simon de Paris at the University of Orléans. He became archdeacon of Toul, and in 1289 became Bishop of Verdun. He died in 1296.
