= Chaumont-sur-Aire =

- Commune
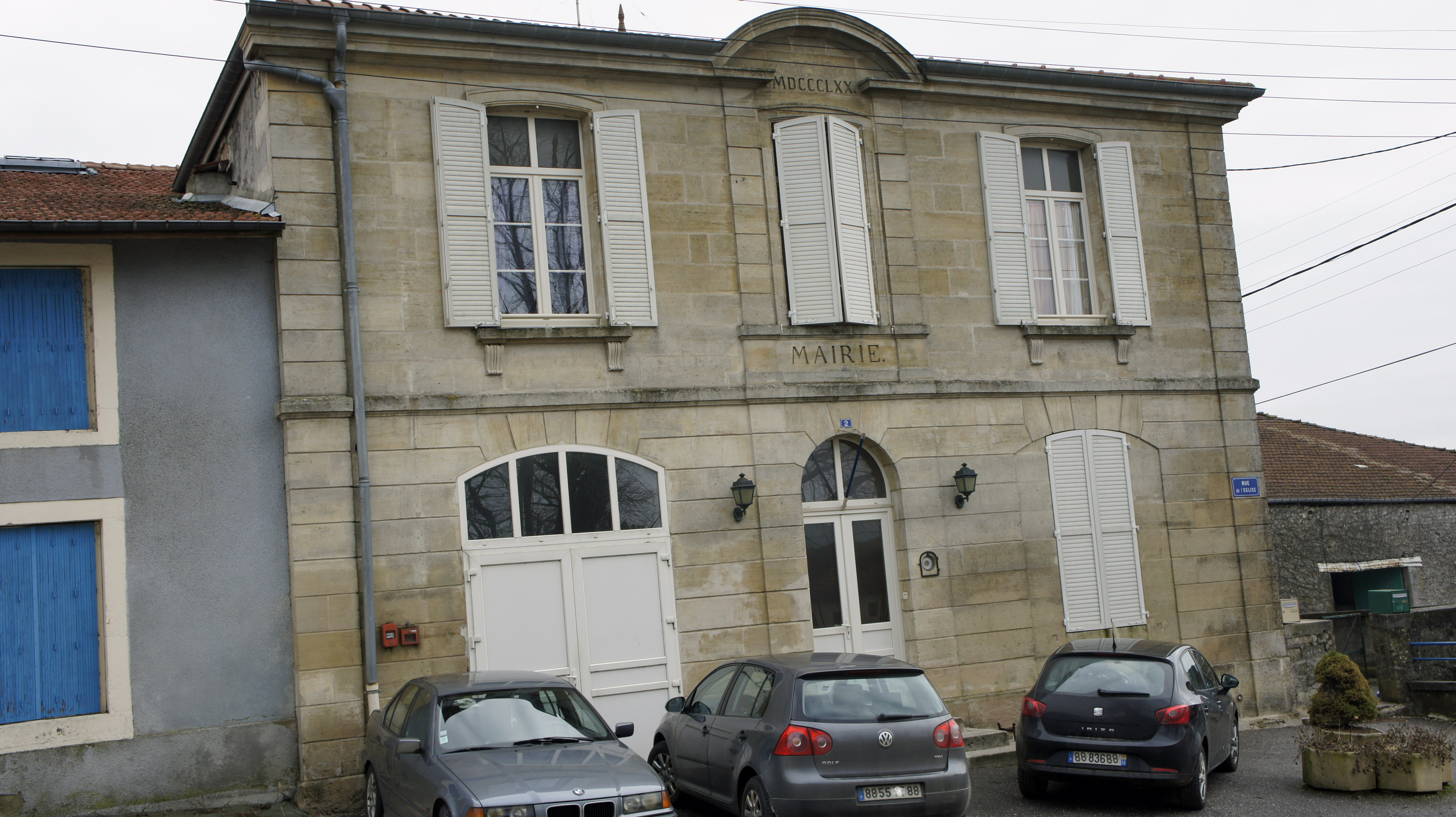
- The town hall in Chaumont-sur-Aire

- Coat of arms
- Location of Chaumont-sur-Aire
- Location within France Location within Grand Est
- Coordinates: 48°55′39″N 5°15′32″E
- Country: France
- Region: Grand Est
- Department: Meuse
- Arrondissement: Bar-le-Duc
- Canton: Revigny-sur-Ornain
- Intercommunality: CC de l'Aire à l'Argonne

Government
  - Mayor (2020–2026): Karine Patris
- Area^{1}: 9.92 km^{2} (3.83 sq mi)
- Elevation: 251 m (823 ft)
- Highest elevation: 313 m (1,027 ft)
- Lowest elevation: 232 m (761 ft)
- Population (2023): 119
  - Density: 12.0/km^{2} (31.1/sq mi)
- Time zone: UTC+01:00 (CET)
  - Summer (DST): UTC+02:00 (CEST)
- INSEE/Postal code: 55108 /55260
- ^{1} French Land Register data, which excludes lakes, ponds, glaciers > 1 km^{2} (0.386 sq mi or 247 acres) and river estuaries.

Chaumont-sur-Aire (French pronunciation: [ʃomɔ̃ syʁ ɛːʁ]; literally "Chaumont on Aire") is a commune in the Meuse department in Grand Est in north-eastern France.

== See also ==
- Communes of the Meuse department
