= Richer (bishop of Verdun) =

- Appointed: 1089
- Installed: 1089
- Term ended: 1107

Richer was bishop of Verdun from 1089 to 1107. Godfrey of Bouillon, Duke of Lower Lorraine, who decided to join the First Crusade ceded the County of Verdun to Richer in 1095. Richer soon granted the county to Godfrey's brother, Baldwin, but Baldwin also joined the crusade.

== Sources ==
- John, Simon (2018). Godfrey of Bouillon: Duke of Lower Lotharingia, Ruler of Latin Jerusalem, c. 1060–1100. Routledge. ISBN 978-1-4724-5896-4.
- Murray, Alan V. (2000). The Crusader Kingdom of Jerusalem: A Dynastic History, 1099–1125. Prosopographica et Geneologica. ISBN 978-1-9009-3403-9.
