= Mengold of Huy =

Saint Meingold of Huy
- Died: 892
- Venerated in: Roman Catholic Church

Saint Meingold (Mengold, Meingaud) (died 892) is said to have been Count of Huy, who was murdered by his opponents in 892. It is possible that Saint Meingold was confused for the count, both having been killed in the same year.

His feast day is 8 February.

== Bibliography ==
- Philippe George : Les Miracles de saint Mengold de Huy. Témoignage privilégié d'un culte à la fin du XIIe siècle, dans Bulletin de la Commission royale d'Histoire, vol.152 (1986), pp. 25–47.
