= Diocese of Verdun =

Catholic diocese in France

Coordinates: 49°09′34″N 5°22′56″E

Diocese of Verdun Dioecesis Virodunensis Diocèse de Verdun

Catholic
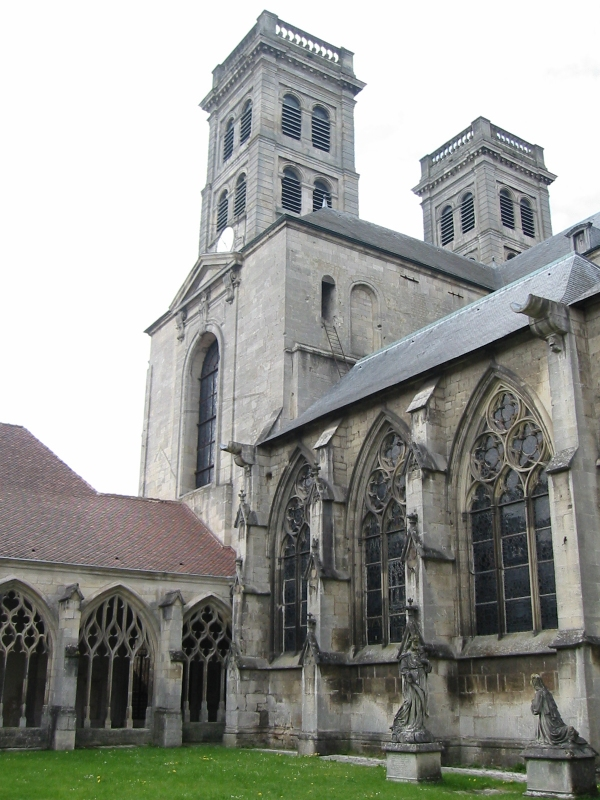
- Verdun Cathedral and Cloister

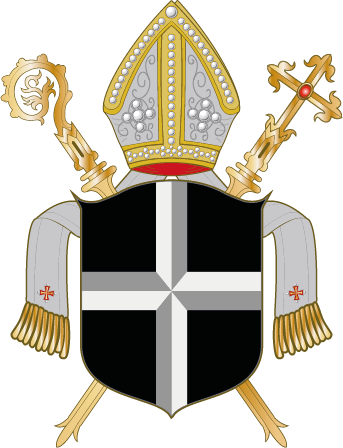
- Coat of arms

Location
- Country: France
- Ecclesiastical province: Besançon
- Metropolitan: Archdiocese of Besançon

Statistics
- Area: 6,211 km^{2} (2,398 sq mi)
- Population: Total; Catholics: (as of 2022); 194,100; 170,120 (87.6%)
- Parishes: 515

Information
- Denomination: Catholic Church
- Sui iuris church: Latin Church
- Rite: Roman Rite
- Established: Restored on 6 October 1822
- Cathedral: Cathedral of Notre Dame de Verdun
- Patron saint: Blessed Virgin Mary Assumed in Heaven
- Secular priests: 41 (Diocesan); 1 (Religious Orders)

Current leadership
- Pope: Leo XIV
- Bishop: Joseph de Metz-Noblat
- Metropolitan Archbishop: Jean-Luc Bouilleret
- Bishops emeritus: François Maupu, Jean-Paul Gusching

Website
- catholique-verdun.cef.fr

The Diocese of Verdun (Latin: Dioecesis Virodunensis; French: Diocèse de Verdun) is a Latin Church ecclesiastical territory or diocese of the Catholic Church in France. It is a suffragan diocese in the ecclesiastical province of the metropolitan Archdiocese of Besançon. The Diocese of Verdun corresponds to the département of Meuse in the région of Lorraine. The diocese is subdivided into 577 parishes.

== History ==
The beginnings of Christianity in Verdun is associated with the name Sanctinus.

=== Contradictions in Sanctius legends ===
One legend, recorded by Bertarius of Verdun (early 10th century), states that Saint Denis (mid-3rd cent.) sent Sanctinus, Bishop of Meaux, and the priest Antoninus to Rome to Pope Clement (c. 91–c. 101) with a report on their sufferings, and that their journey passed through Verdun, both going and returning, where they preached Christianity. This legend, like many similar ones referring to a diocese's earliest connection with the Apostle Peter or one of his disciples, hardly needs refutation.

Bertarius also reports that he read in a "Life of Saint Servatius the bishop" that Sanctinus, Clavorum episcopus was present at the Council of Cologne (Colonia Agrippinensis), summoned to depose its archbishop. It has been argued that there was no such council.

In another tradition, the city was first evangelized around 332 by St Sanctinus, Bishop of Meaux, who became the first bishop. Sanctinus erected the first Christian oratory dedicated to St. Peter and St. Paul.

The diocese dates to the 4th century.

The first bishop known to history is Polychronius (Pulchrone) who lived in the fifth century and was a relative and disciple of St. Lupus de Troyes. "Other noteworthy bishops are: Vitonus (Vanne) (502–529); St. Agericus (Airy) (554–591), friend of St. Gregory of Tours and of Fortunatus; Paulus of Verdun (630–648), formerly Abbot of the Benedictine Monastery of Tholey in the Diocese of Trier; and Madalvaeus (Mauve) (753–776)."

In 916 or 917, the 37th year of Bishop Dado, the cathedral suffered a major fire, and nearly all the ancient records of the church were destroyed, according to the chronicler Bertarius of Verdun.

=== Cathedral and Chapter ===
Bishop Polychronius is credited with the establishment of the cathedral dedicated to Nôtre-Dame, after the middle of the fifth century. This cathedral burned to the ground in a fire in the time of Bishop Madalveus (753–c. 775), and was rebuilt immediately, with enlargements made by Bishop Hatto (847–870) in 865. It was burned again twice, under the Normans and by Duke Boso, in the episcopate of Bishop Dado (880–923). It was damaged again by the Hungarians in 923, and rebuilt by Bishop Heimon (990–1024). Duke Godefroy burned it in 1047, and Bishop Theirry repaired it in 1050. Count Renaud de Bar reduced it to ruins in 1114.

The new cathedral of Verdun, built by Bishop Adalbero of Chiny, was consecrated on 11 November 1147, by Pope Eugenius III.

The cathedral was served and administered by a corporation called the Chapter. Until the 10th century, the canons of the Chapter lived in common with the bishop at his expense. Bishop Dado (880–923) divided the diocesan income into two portions, one of which was given to the canons. The Chapter consisted of ten dignities (the Princerie, the Dean, the Archdeacon of Argonne, the Archdeacon of the Woëvre, the Archdeacon of la Rivière, the Cellerer, the Treasurer, the Cantor, the Scholasticus and the Chancellor) and forty-two prebends. The office of Princerie was abolished by a bull of Pope Clement VII on 9 February 1385. Until 1695, the deans were elected by the Chapter; thereafter, the kings of France made the appointment. The last dean, Claude-Elizabeth de la Corbière, was arrested in October 1792, taken to Paris, tried by a revolutionary tribunal, and executed on 25 April 1794.

When Pope Leo IX visited Verdun in the second week of October 1049, he consecrated the collegiate church of La Madeleine, which had just been rebuilt by the Archdeacon of Woëvre, Canon Ermenfroy; at the archdeacon's request, the pope united the archdeaconate and the provostship of the church of La Madeleine in perpetuity. An addition to the provost, there was a dean and a cantor According to local tradition, the church had been founded by Saint Rémi of Reims in the 6th century.

The collegiate church of Sainte-Croix of Verdun was founded by the Princier Amicus at the beginning of the 11th century, with a Chapter composed of twelve canons. Within a century, the church was in ruins. Bishop Henri reorganized the establishment in 1126, with six canons, and annexed it to the abbey of Benedictine nuns of Saint-Maur, where the canons, headed by a Treasurer, served as chaplains. The abbess had the right to appoint to vacancies. The collegiate church was destroyed in 1552, at the time of the French invasion under King Henri II. The canons were transferred to the chapel of S. Laurence, near the cathedral. In 1777, Pope Pius VI suppressed the entire establishment.

Bishop Henri d'Aspremont (1312–1350) established the collegiate church of Saint-Maur in Hattonchâtel in 1328, providing that the title of Provost be united to the title of the archdeacon de la Rivière, with a prebendal canonicate, and that the incumbent need not be resident. There was also a Dean and six canons. The right of nomination belonged to the bishops of Verdun until 1530, when it was transferred to the Duke of Lorraine.

On 30 September 1389, King Charles VI of France and Bishop Liébauld de Cousans concluded a treaty, in which the bishops of Verdun acquired dominium and jurisdiction in high, middle and low justice over the city of Verdun. The treaty was confirmed by Pope Clement VII on 13 February 1390.

=== French diocese ===
The three bishoprics (Metz, Toul, and Verdun) had been under control of the French since 1552, but the dioceses resisted, and it was not until the Peace of Westphalia in 1648 that their acquisition was formally recognized. In the reign of King Louis XIV, in 1664, the kings of France were granted the right to nominate the bishop when a vacancy occurred. This concession did not immediately extend to any other benefice in the dioceses, as it had in the concordat of 1516 with King Francis I. It was not until 1668 that Clement IX removed the limitation.

In 1565, Bishop Nicolas Psaume (1548–1575) invited the Jesuits to establish themselves in the diocese of Verdun, with episcopal authority. He provided them with the hospital of Saint-Nicolas as their church, their residence, and their school (collège). Later papal approval was obtained. The Jesuit house in Verdun became the novitiate for most of France.

From 1624 to 1636, a large bastioned citadel was constructed. following the plans of Jean Errard of Bar-le-Duc, on the site of the Abbey of Saint Vanne. The Church of Saint-Vanne was destroyed in 1832 and its cloister, which had been converted into barracks, was burned in 1870 during the Franco-Prussian War.

==== Seminary ====
Bishop Armand de Monchy d'Hocquincourt (1668–1679) took the first steps toward the erection of a seminary in the diocese of Verdun. In November 1678 he obtained letters patent from King Louis XIV, granting permission for the establishment. The bishop committed 1,000 livres per year to the project, and imposed on the clergy a tax amounting to 1,500 livres. The seminary opened in December 1678, in the episcopal palace, but soon moved to larger quarters, since, by 1 November 1682, there were twenty students. Bishop Hippolyte de Béthune (1681–1720) brought the Canons Regular from the abbey of Saint-Nicolas-des-Prés to form the staff. But within 50 years, the buildings were nothing but a mass of ruins. Through royal generosity, Bishop Charles-François D'Hallencourt (1721–1754) was granted the income of the abbey of Saint-Airy fir eight years, and from 1741 to 1749 built a proper seminary and chapel. When Pope Clement XI published the bull Unigenitus against Jansenism in 1713, the bishop and clergy of the seminary joined the opposition; but under Bishop d'Hallencourt, in 1737, the canons regular were forced to leave the seminary, and secular priests filled the posts. The seminary was closed in January 1791 by the French National Assembly.

=== French Revolution ===
Even before it directed its attention to the Church directly, the National Constituent Assembly attacked the institution of monasticism. On 13 February 1790. it issued a decree which stated that the government would no longer recognize solemn religious vows taken by either men or women. In consequence, Orders and Congregations which lived under a Rule were suppressed in France. Members of either sex were free to leave their monasteries or convents if they wished, and could claim an appropriate pension by applying to the local municipal authority.

The Assembly ordered the replacement of political subdivisions of the ancien régime with subdivisions called "departments", to be characterized by a single administrative city in the center of a compact area. The decree was passed on 22 December 1789, the boundaries fixed on 26 February 1790, with the institution to be effective on 4 March 1790. A new department was created called "Meuse," which comprised the three bishoprics and the district of Bar-le-Duc (Barrois), and Verdun was fixed as its administrative center. The National Constituent Assembly then, on 6 February 1790, instructed its ecclesiastical committee to prepare a plan for the reorganization of the clergy. At the end of May, its work was presented as a draft Civil Constitution of the Clergy, which, after vigorous debate, was approved on 12 July 1790. There was to be one diocese in each department, requiring the suppression of approximately fifty dioceses. The former diocese of Verdun was assigned to the "Metropole du Nord-Est", with its metropolitan seated in Reims, by decree of 12 July 1790.

In the Civil Constitution of the Clergy, the National Constituent Assembly also abolished cathedral chapters, canonicates, prebends, chapters and dignities of collegiate churches, chapters of both secular and regular clergy of both sexes, and abbeys and priories whether existing under a Rule or in commendam.

On 13 January 1791, the municipal officials of Verdun presented Bishop Henri-Louis Rene Desnos a copy of the decree of 27 November 1790, demanding an oath of allegiance to the Civil Constitution of the Clergy. The bishop submitted his formal refusal on 21 January, and left the city. On 5 February, he issued a pastoral letter, signed at Trier. The episcopal chair of Verdun was declared vacant, and on 21 February 1791, the electors of the department of Meuse met to elect a Constitutional Bishop.

They elected Jean-Baptiste Aubry, former teacher of humanities and philosophy at the Collège de Bar, and parish priest of Véel. He was consecrated a bishop in Paris at the Oratory church by Jean-Pierre Saurine, assisted by Robert-Thomas Lindet and François-Xavier Laurent, in a ceremony that was both blasphemous and schismatic. He returned to Verdun on 19 March. In 1792, Verdun was occupied by a Prussian army on 2 September 1792, and the constitutional clergy were compelled to withdraw, though they returned when the Prussians withdrew after six weeks. Bishop Aubry celebrated a Te Deum in the cathedral on 23 October 1792. Under the Terror, religion was abolished, the Constitutional Church dispersed, and Aubry returned to his birthplace, Saint-Aubin, where he worked in a mill and was mayor of the commune. He returned to his cathedral in 1797.

=== Restoration ===
Until 1801 Verdun was, in the eyes of the Papacy, part of the ecclesiastical province of the Archbishop of Trier. On 29 November 1801, implementing the terms of the concordat of 1801 between the French Consulate, headed by First Consul Napoleon Bonaparte, and Pope Pius VII, the bishopric of Verdun (Meuse) and all the other dioceses were suppressed. This removed all the contaminations and novelties introduced by the Constitutional Church. The pope then recreated the French ecclesiastical order, with the bull "Qui Christi Domini," respecting in most ways the changes introduced during the Revolution, including the reduction in the number of archdioceses and dioceses, and the re-drawing of diocesan boundaries. Verdun, however, was not restored, though other dioceses in the area became suffragans of the archdiocese of Besançon; the diocese of Trier lost its metropolitan status. The territory of the former diocese of Verdun was added to the Diocese of Nancy. The seminarians from the former diocese of Verdun attended the Major Seminary in Nancy.

In implementation of the concordat of 27 July 1817, between King Louis XVIII and Pope Pius VII, the diocese of Verdun should have been restored by the bull "Commissa divinitus", but the French Parliament refused to ratify the agreement. It was not until 6 October 1822 that a revised version of the papal bull, "Paternae Charitatis" , fortified by an ordonnance of Louis XVIII of 13 January 1823, received the acceptance of all parties. The diocese of Verdun became a suffragan of the archdiocese of Besançon.

On 31 August 1823, the Chapter of canons in the cathedral was restored. In accordance with the terms of the Concordat of 1802, there were eight canons prebendial, each nominated by the bishop, with the approval of the head-of-state. The dignities were: the vicars-general of the diocese, the dean, the canon-theological (preacher), the grand-penitentiary, the grand-cantor, and the master-of-ceremonies.

On 21 November 1823, the diocesan seminary of Verdun was reopened.

In the 1820s, documents began to circulate in the diocese, and appeared in newspapers, purporting to be "Prophecies of Orval," or "The Previsions of a Solitary," a divine revelation of the first half of the 15th century. They attracted increasing attention after the revolution of 1830 and the revolution of 1848. The bishop of Verdun, Louis Rossat (1844–1866), was compelled to conduct an investigation, and, in a letter to his fellow bishops of 6 February 1849, he pronounced them to be a forgery, the work of a "Brother Aubertin," otherwise a Canon Regular and still alive in 1837, who admitted to the bishop that he was the author of the prophecies. The cause of authenticity was immediately taken up by enthusiasts and monarchists supporting "King Henry V" of France, and a pamphlet war raged for some years.

=== World War I ===
During World War I, 1n February 1916, the German offensive, directed by General Erich von Falkenhayn, surrounded and occupied Verdun. More than 200 parishes fell under occupation by the German army and communication with the Bishop of Verdun practically cut off. When the city came under bombardment the diocesan administration relocated to Bar-le-Duc, and did not return to the heavily damage Verdun until 1921. The administration of the parishes was confided to Thomas Louis Heylen, Bishop of Namur, who had been appointed vicar apostolic to French territory under German occupation.

In 1917, the French recovered the city. One hundred and fifty-three churches were destroyed and 166 damaged, including the Cathédrale Notre-Dame de Verdun, whose towers have never been rebuilt. Of 186 priests who enlisted, 13 were killed, 20 seriously wounded, and 50 taken prisoner. One hundred and sixty citations and diplomas of honor and 120 decorations were awarded to priests of the diocese.

== Bishops of Verdun ==
=== Early bishops ===
- [ ca. 346: St. Saintin ]
- 356–383: Maurus
- ???–420: Salvinus
- ca. 440: Arator
- 454–470: Polychronius
- 470–486: Possessor
- 486–502: Freminus (Firminus)
- 502–529: Vitonus
- 529–554: Desideratus
- 554–591: Agericus
- 588– c. 614: Harimeris
- ???–621: Ermenfrid
- 623–626: Godo
- 641–648: Paulus
- 648–665: Gisloald
- 665–689: Gerebert
- 689–701: Armonius
- 701–710: Agrebert
- 711–715: Bertalamius
- 716: Abbo
- 716–722: Pepo
- 722–730: Volchisus
- 730–732: Agronius

...

- 753– after 775: Madalveus
- 781–798: Peter
- 798–802: Austram
- 802–824: Heriland
- 824–847: Hilduin
- 847–870: Hatto
- 870–879: Berenhard
- 880–923: Dado
- 923–925: Hugh (I)
- 925–939: Bernuin
- 939–959: Berengar
- 959–983: Wigfrid
- 983–984: Hugh (II)
- 984–984: Adalbero (I)
- 985–990: Adalbero II

=== Prince-bishops ===
==== 990 to 1300 ====
- 990–1024: Haimont (Heymon)
- 1024–1039: Reginbert
- 1039–1046: Richard I
- 1047–1089: Theoderic
- 1089–1107: Richer
- 1107–1114: Richard II of Grandpré

1114-1117: Sede vacante

1114–1117: Mazo, Administrator

- 1118–1129: Henry
- 1129–1131: Ursion de Watronville
- 1131–1156: Adalbero of Chiny
- 1156–1162: Albert I of Marcey
- 1163–1171: Richard III of Crisse
- 1172–1181: Arnulf of Chiny-Verdun
- 1181–1186: Henri de Castres
- 1186–1208: Albert (II) of Hierges
- 1208–1216: Robert of Grandpré
- 1217–1224: John of Aspremont
- 1224–1245: Radulf of Torote
- 1245–1245: Guy (Wido) of Traignel
- 1245–1247: Guy (Wido) of Mellote
- 1247–1252: John II of Aachen
- 1252–1255: Jacques Pantaléon
- 1255–1271: Robert II of Médidan
- 1271–1273: Ulrich of Sarvay
- 1275–1278: Gerard of Grandson
- 1278–1286: Henri of Grandson

1286–1289: Sede vacante

- 1289–1296: Jacques de Révigny
- 1297–1302: Jean d'Aspromonte

==== 1300 to 1500 ====
- 1303–1305: Thomas de Blamont
- 1305–1312: Nicholas de Neuville
- 1312–1350: Henri d'Aspremont

François Chaillot, suffragan

- 1350–1351: Otho de Poitiers
- 1351–1361: Hugues de Bar
- 1362–1372: Jean de Bourbon-Montperoux
- 1372–1375: Jean de Dampierre
- 1375–1381: Guy de Roye
- 1381–1404: Liébauld de Cousans, Avignon Obedience
- 1404–1420: Jean de Sarrebrück, Avignon Obedience
- 1419–1423: Louis de Bar, Administrator
- 1423–1423: Raymond
- 1423–1424: Guillaume de Montjoie
- 1424–1430: Louis de Bar, Administrator
- 1430–1437: Louis of Haraucourt
- 1437–1449: Guillaume Fillastre
- 1449–1456: Louis de Haraucourt
- 1457–1500: William of Haraucourt

==== after 1500 ====
- 1500–1508: Warry de Dommartin
- 1508–1522: Louis de Lorraine
- 1523–1544: Jean de Lorraine (1498–1550), brother of predecessor
- 1544–1547: Nicolas de Mercœur (1524–1577), nephew of predecessor
- 1548–1575: Nicolas Psaume.
- 1576–1584: Nicolas Bousmard
- 1585–1587: Charles de Lorraine
- 1588–1593: Nicolas Boucher
- 1593–1610: Eric of Lorraine
  - 1593–1601: Christophe de la Vallée, administrator
- 1610–1622: Charles de Lorraine,

=== Bishops under French rule ===
- 1623–1661 : François de Lorraine

1661–1668 : Sede vacante

- 1668–1679 : Armand de Monchy d'Hocquincourt
- 1681–1720 : Hippolyte de Béthune
- 1721–1754 : Charles-François D'Hallencourt
- 1754–1769 : Aymar-Fr.-Chrétien-Michel de Nicolai
- 1770–1793 : Henri-Louis Rene Desnos

Constitutional Bishop of Meuse
- 1791–1802 :Jean-Baptiste Aubry

=== After the Concordat of 1817 (1823) ===
(1817) : Guillaume-Aubin de Villèle

- 1823–1830: Etienne-Bruno-Marie d'Arbou
- 1826–1831: François-Joseph de Villeneuve-Esclapon
- 1832–1836: Placide-Bruno Valayer
- 1836–1844: Augustin-Jean Letourneur

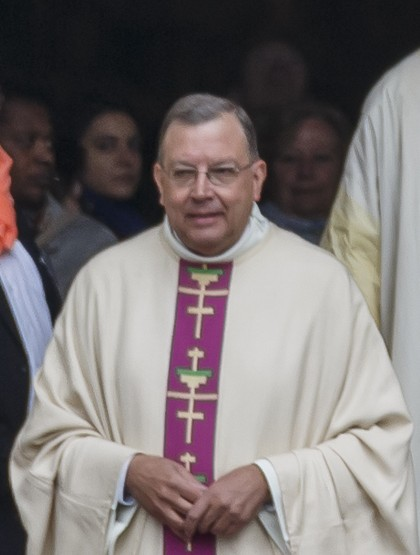
Bishop Jean-Paul Gusching in 2014

- 1844–1866: Louis Rossat
- 1867–1884: Augustin Hacquard
- 1884–1887: Jean-Natalis-François Gonindard
- 1887–1901: Jean-Pierre Pagis
- 1901–1909: Louis-Ernest Dubois
- 1910–1913: Jean Arturo Chollet
- 1914–1946: Charles-Marie-André Ginisty
- 1946–1963: Marie-Paul-Georges Petit
- 1963–1986: Pierre Francis Lucien Anatole Boillon
- 1987–1999: Marcel Paul Herriot

=== 21st century ===
- 2000 – 2014: François Paul Marie Maupu
- 3 July 2014 – 27 September 2025: Jean-Paul Gusching
- 11 April 2026 – present: Joseph de Metz-Noblat

== See also ==
- Prince-Bishopric of Verdun
- Verdun Cathedral

== Books ==
- Gams, Pius Bonifatius (1873). Series episcoporum Ecclesiae catholicae. Ratisbon: Typis et Sumptibus Georgii Josephi Manz. pp. 652–653. (Use with caution; obsolete)
- Eubel, Conradus, ed. (1913). Hierarchia catholica (in Latin). Vol. 1 (Tomus I) (second ed.). Munster: Libreria Regensbergiana. p. 527.
- Eubel, Conradus, ed. (1914). Hierarchia catholica (in Latin). Vol. 2 (Tomus II) (second ed.). Munster: Libreria Regensbergiana.
- Eubel, Conradus, ed. (1923). Hierarchia catholica (in Latin). Vol. 3 (Tomus III) (second ed.). Munster: Libreria Regensbergiana.. Archived.
- Gauchat, Patritius (Patrice) (1935). Hierarchia catholica (in Latin). Vol. 4 (IV) (1592–1667). Münster: Libraria Regensbergiana. p. 219.
- Ritzler, Remigius; Sefrin, Pirminus (1952). Hierarchia catholica medii et recentis aevi (in Latin). Vol. 5 (V) (1667–1730). Patavii: Messagero di S. Antonio.
- Ritzler, Remigius; Sefrin, Pirminus (1958). Hierarchia catholica medii et recentis aevi. Vol. 6 (Tomus VI) (1730–1799). Patavii: Messagero di S. Antonio.
- Ritzler, Remigius; Sefrin, Pirminus (1968). Hierarchia Catholica medii et recentioris aevi (in Latin). Vol. VII (1800–1846). Monasterii: Libreria Regensburgiana.
- Remigius Ritzler; Pirminus Sefrin (1978). Hierarchia catholica Medii et recentioris aevi (in Latin). Vol. VIII (1846–1903). Il Messaggero di S. Antonio.
- Pięta, Zenon (2002). Hierarchia catholica medii et recentioris aevi (in Latin). Vol. IX (1903–1922). Padua: Messagero di San Antonio. ISBN 978-88-250-1000-8.

== Studies ==
- Clouêt, Louis (1867, 1868, 1870). Histoire de Verdun et du pays verdunois. (in French). Verdun: Ch. Laurent. Volume 1. Volume 2. Volume 3.
- Duchesne, Louis (1915). Fastes episcopaux de l'ancienne Gaule. Vol. III: Les provinces du Nord et de l'Est. (in French). Paris: A. Fontemoing, 1915.
- Goyau, Georges (1912). "Diocese of Verdun." The Catholic Encyclopedia. Vol. 15. New York: Robert Appleton Company, 1912. 15 January 2023.
- Jean, Armand (1891). Les évêques et les archevêques de France depuis 1682 jusqu'a 1801. (in French). Paris: A. Picard, 1891. pp. 413–415.
- Longnon; Auguste; Carrière, Victor (1915). Recueil des historiens de la France: Pouillés. (in French and Latin). Volume 5. Paris: Imprimerie nationale, 1903. [Verdun: Pouillé de 1600, pp. 349–387
- Pionnier, Edmond (1906). Essai sur l'histoire de la révolution à Verdun: (1789–1795). (in French). Nancy: A. Crépin-Leblond, 1906.
- Robinet, Nicolas-Narcisse (1888). Pouillé du Diocèse de Verdun. (in French). Volume 1. Verdun: Laurent, 1888.
- Rochette, Marc (2005). Les évêques de Verdun: 1823–1946. (in French). Connaissance de la Meuse, 2005.
- Roussel, Nicolas (1745, 1863). Histoire ecclésiastique et civile de Verdun, avec le pouillé, la carte du diocèse et le plan de la ville en 1745 ... Édition revue et annotée par une Société d'ecclésiastiques et d'hommes de lettres, etc. (in French). Bar-le-Duc: Contant-Laguerre. Volume 1 (1863). Volume 2 (1864).
- Sainte-Marthe, Denis de (1785). Gallia christiana, in provincias ecclesiasticas distributa (in Latin). Vol. Tomus decimus-tertius (13) (second ed.). Paris: Johannes- Baptista Coignard. pp. 150–185, Instrumenta, pp. 1162–1342, "Instrumenta, " pp. 551–584.
