= Wenrich of Trier =

Wenrich of Trier was a German ecclesiastico-political writer of the eleventh century. In 1080 he wrote a pamphlet regarding the Investiture Controversy between the Pope and the Holy Roman Emperor.

== Biography ==
He was a canon at Verdun, and afterwards scholasticus at Trier.

Sigebert of Gembloux (Patrologia Latina, CXL, 584 sq.) calls him also Bishop of Vercelli. However, the early documents of the diocese leave no place for him in the list of bishops.

== Work ==
Wenrich authored a controversial treatise on behalf of Holy Roman Emperor Henry IV during his struggle with Pope Gregory VII (the Conflict of Investitures). The form is that of an open letter to the pope; the tone is friendly, as though what he had to say was painful to the author. Wenrich disputes the efficiency of the emperor's excommunication (1080), opposes the laws of celibacy promulgated by the pope, condemns the inciting of the people against the emperor, defends investitures by texts of Scripture and the history of the Church, upbraids Gregory for being an accomplice in the setting up of a rival king, and reminds the pope that he himself has been accused of unlawful striving after the papal dignity, and even of the use of force to attain this end.

A reply was written by Manegold of Lautenbach.
