= Herman of Metz =

Herman or Hermann (French: Hériman; Latin: Hermannus) was the bishop of Metz from 1073 until 1090. As a result of the Investiture Controversy, he was twice exiled from his diocese, in 1078–1081 and 1084–1089, and had to face two antibishops.

== Royal bishop ==
Hermann may have been related to the House of Ardenne. He was an archdeacon in 1063 and the provost of Saint Lambert's Cathedral in Liège in 1066. On the recommendation of Archbishop Anno II of Cologne, King Henry IV appointed him bishop of Metz in early 1073. Hermann was at the royal court in October 1073 and followed Henry IV into Italy in April 1074. In October 1074, he visited the Countess Matilda of Tuscany, who was probably his relative by marriage. After the battle of Langensalza in 1075, he was entrusted with a number of Saxon prisoners.

Hermann's support for the Gregorian reforms increasingly brought him into conflict with Henry IV. At the Synod of Worms in January 1076, Hermann initially refused to condemn Pope Gregory VII before bending to the will of the bishops supportive of the king. After the synod, he wrote to Gregory seeking a pardon. Gregory's response, dated 25 August, defends the papal stance in the growing Investiture Controversy in response to the writings of Gottschalk of Aachen.

== Anti-royalist bishop ==
After Henry IV's excommunication in 1076, Herman released the prisoners he had been holding. In 1078, he went to the royal court with a large party of fellow Lotharingians to persuade Henry to yield. This only provoked the royal wrath and, in late April 1078, Hermann was forced into exile while a royal army occupied Metz in May. He spent the next few years in Liège, Verdun and Rome. Gregory VII named him an apostolic legate. He supported Hermann of Salm as king in opposition to Henry IV and represented him at Gregory's Lenten synod of 11 February 1079. The date of his return to Metz is uncertain, but it was not before 1081. On 15 March that year, Gregory wrote to him to justify his second excommunication of Henry IV in 1080. This is "the longest and most widely noted of all Greogry's letters."

In 1084, the emperor came to Metz in person to force Herman into exile. The Council of Mainz in 1085 declared him deposed on the grounds that he had failed to attend. The emperor installed a rival bishop, Walo, later replaced by Bruno. Hermann passed his exiled in Liège and Sint-Truiden. He also visited the Countess Matilda in Tuscany. In 1088, the townspeople forced Bruno out and invited Hermann back.

== Reconciled bishop ==
Hermann submitted to Henry and returned to Metz early in 1089. In 1090, he translated the relics of Saint Clement of Metz to the cathedral of Metz for one day. He may also have translated the relics of Glodesind to the cathedral. He then issued a charter of privileges in favour of the Abbey of Saint-Clément, where the relics were permanently located. The charter accuses Bishop Theoderic I of having attempted to steal the relics from the abbey, but the surviving copy of the charter was tampered with in the 12th century by the monks of Saint-Clément and is not reliable in detail.

Hermann died on 4 May 1090 after a short illness. He was buried in the church of Saint-Pierre-aux-Images.

== Sources ==
- Cowdrey, H. E. J. (1998). Pope Gregory VII, 1073–1085. Clarendon Press.
- Herrick, Samantha Kahn (2020). "Friend or Foe? The Bishops of Metz in Monastic Historical Narrative, c. 1000–c. 1200". Journal of Ecclesiastical History. 71 (2).
- Parisse, Michel; Hari, Arnaud (2015). Catalogue historique des évêques de Metz: Le Moyen Âge (PDF). Paris: LAMOP. Archived from the original (PDF) on 2018-04-11.
- Robinson, I. S. (1999). Henry IV of Germany, 1056–1106. Cambridge University Press.
