= Verdun Cathedral =

Cathedral in Verdun, Lorraine, France

Verdun Cathedral Cathédrale Notre-Dame de Verdun
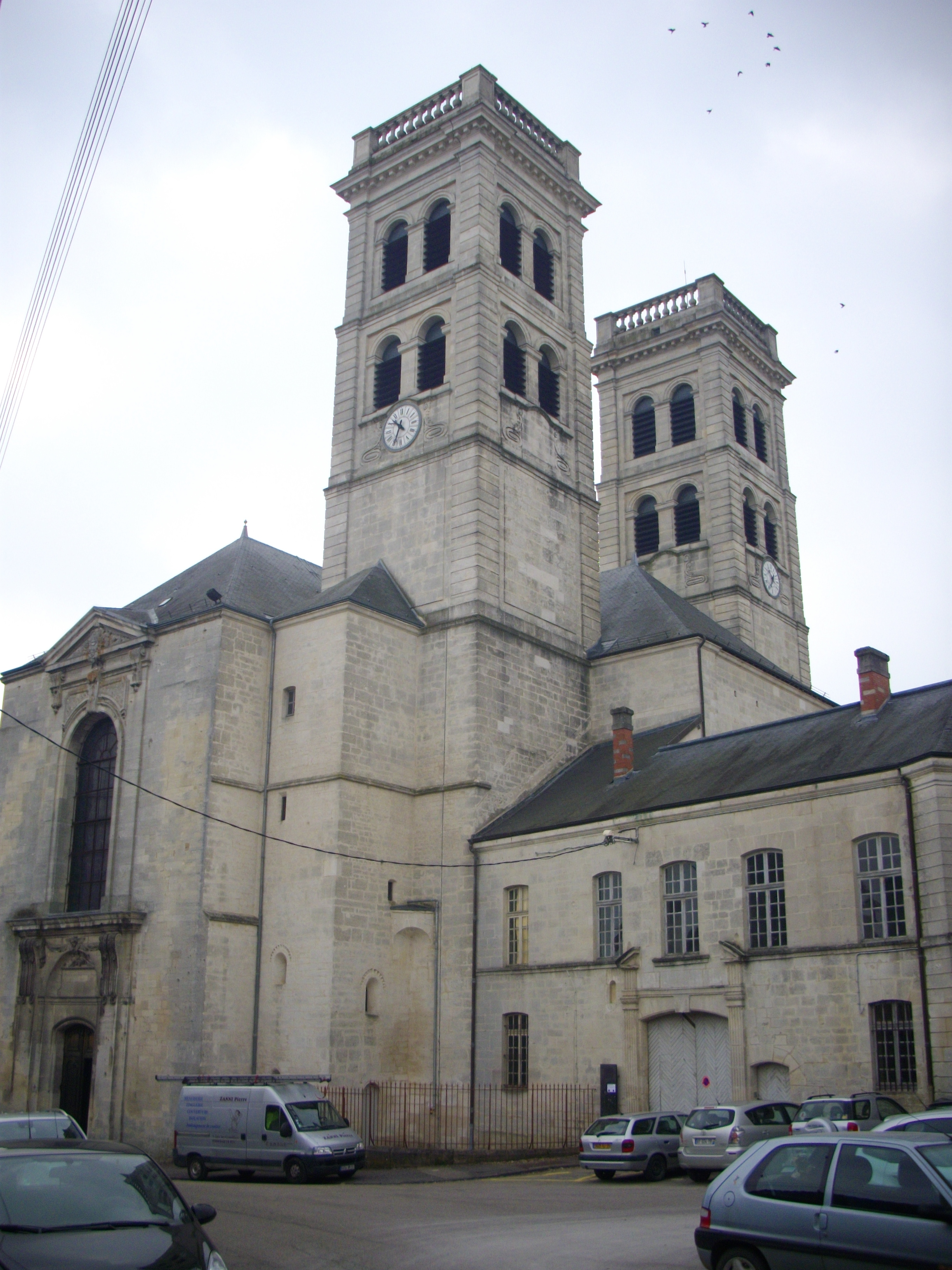
- Verdun Cathedral
- Verdun Cathedral; Cathédrale Notre-Dame de Verdun
- 49°09′34″N 5°22′57″E
- Location: Verdun, France
- Denomination: Roman Catholic Church
- Churchmanship: Roman

History
- Status: Cathedral

Architecture
- Functional status: Active
- Architectural type: church
- Style: Gothic
- Groundbreaking: 990; 1036 years ago
- Completed: 1147; 879 years ago

Administration
- Province: Diocese of Verdun

Monument historique
- Official name: Cathédrale Notre-Dame de Verdun
- Type: Classé
- Designated: 1906
- Reference no.: PA00106659

Verdun Cathedral (French: Cathédrale Notre-Dame de Verdun) is a Roman Catholic cathedral located in the town of Verdun, Lorraine, France. The cathedral is the seat of the Bishops of Verdun. The origins of the cathedral trace to the 3rd century, making it the oldest cathedral in Lorraine and was declared a monument historique on 30 October 1906. The church is notable for its mix of Gothic, Romanesque, and Neo-Classical architecture, for its historical significance for marking the start of the Battle of Verdun during World War I.

== History ==
The origins of the cathedral date to 330 AD, when Saint Saintin evangelized the city of Verdun, becoming its first bishop. On a hill near the city called Mont Saint Vanne, he founded a church dedicated to Saints Peter and Paul, which was later expanded into a Benedictine abbey. Threatened by Hunnic invasions in the 5th century, Saint Pulchrone moved the congregation into a newly built cathedral within the Roman castrum, at its present location. After a fire destroyed the church in the early 740s, work immediately commenced to repair the structure using subsidies from neighboring prelates, including from Chrodegang, Bishop of Metz. Following the decline of the Carolingian Empire, the town was attacked by Count Boson, who sacked and burned the church in 917. The site sat in ruins until 990, when Bishop Haimont ordered the construction of a new Romanesque cathedral.

The cathedral was completed in 1024, however, it was destroyed again by Reginald I, Count of Bar. By 1068, work recommenced to rebuild the church under the episcopate of Thierry the Great (1068–1083). The new church would retain the original Carolingian plan with the addition of a new double choir. The unfinished cathedral and cloister was consecrated on November 11, 1147, by Pope Eugene III, accompanied by several cardinals and Bernard of Clairvaux. Construction soon advanced to the east choir, the two portals of Saint John and of the Lion, and the crypts. Not long after consecration, the skilled diplomat and bishop Alberic of Ostia was buried in the cathedral and Bernard of Clairvaux said a funeral mass for his friend.

Starting in the 14th century and extending into the 17th century, the cathedral was rebuilt in a Gothic style. New additions included the replacement of the flat wooden ceiling with a ribbed vault design, enlarged windows, and a rood screen. At about the same time the cloister was entirely rebuilt in the Flamboyant Gothic style. These refurbishments also included frescoes, spires, and the addition of side chapels installed along the nave. On 2 April 1755, the roof and towers were set on fire by lightning, leaving the cathedral badly damaged. From 1760 the building was overhauled in a Neo-Classical and Rococo style, of which the principal works included rebuilding only two of the four towers, a complete refurbishment of the nave, and the installation of an organ and baldachin.

The cathedral was pillaged in November 1793 during the Reign of Terror, and was repurposed as a Temple of Reason after the French Revolution. The cathedral served as a garrison and observation post for French soldiers during World War I. As a result, the site was classified as a military target by German forces, and faced heavy bombardment throughout the war. The first shot into the town, fired from a German naval gun on February 21, 1916, directly hit the cathedral, marking the start of the Battle of Verdun. By the end of the war, although the bell towers were left standing, the eastern block and cloister had been completely destroyed. Between 1920 and 1935, extensive restorations restored the western choir to its 12th-century appearance, and the stained glass windows were recreated and reinstalled in the nave. During the restoration, a number of Romanesque features, including sections of the 12th century nave were rediscovered, as well as the crypt. The cathedral was re-inaugurated in 1935, and in July 1946 the cathedral was visited by the future Pope John XXIII. Pope Pius XII raised the cathedral to a minor basilica in September 1947, the year of the 9th centenary of the dedication of the building.

== Architecture ==
The cathedral's layout follows a traditional Romanesque plan, featuring a simple central nave, two transepts forming a double-cross configuration, and two opposing apses, each flanked by a pair of bell towers and supported by crypts beneath. This Carolingian-influenced design measures approximately 94 meters (308 ft) in length, with a nave width of 12.4 meters (41 ft) and a height under the vaults of 18.5 meters (61 ft), emphasizing horizontal expanse over verticality. Situated on the side of the cathedral is a cloister, constructed in a Rayonnant Gothic style featuring an elaborate ribbed vaulted ceiling and long corridors.

The interior of the church features a ribbed vault nave and 14th-century frescoes on the walls. Furnishings dating between the 15th and 17th centuries include a baldacchino with twisted columns over the main altar, completed in 1760. An organ rebuilt in 1935 by Theodore Jacquot after the original instrument was destroyed sits above the nave. The Chapel of the Rosary was built between 1505 and 1515 by the architect Nicolas Masson in the Flamboyant Gothic style. The Baroque altar is surmounted by a pietà created in 1774. The chapel is enclosed by a 19th-century wrought-iron gate, inspired by the choir screens of Notre-Dame de Paris. The reliquary contains a relic taken from the Veil of the Virgin, a treasure of Chartres Cathedral. The relic was given to Verdun on October 20, 1933, by Raoul Harscouët, Bishop of Chartres.

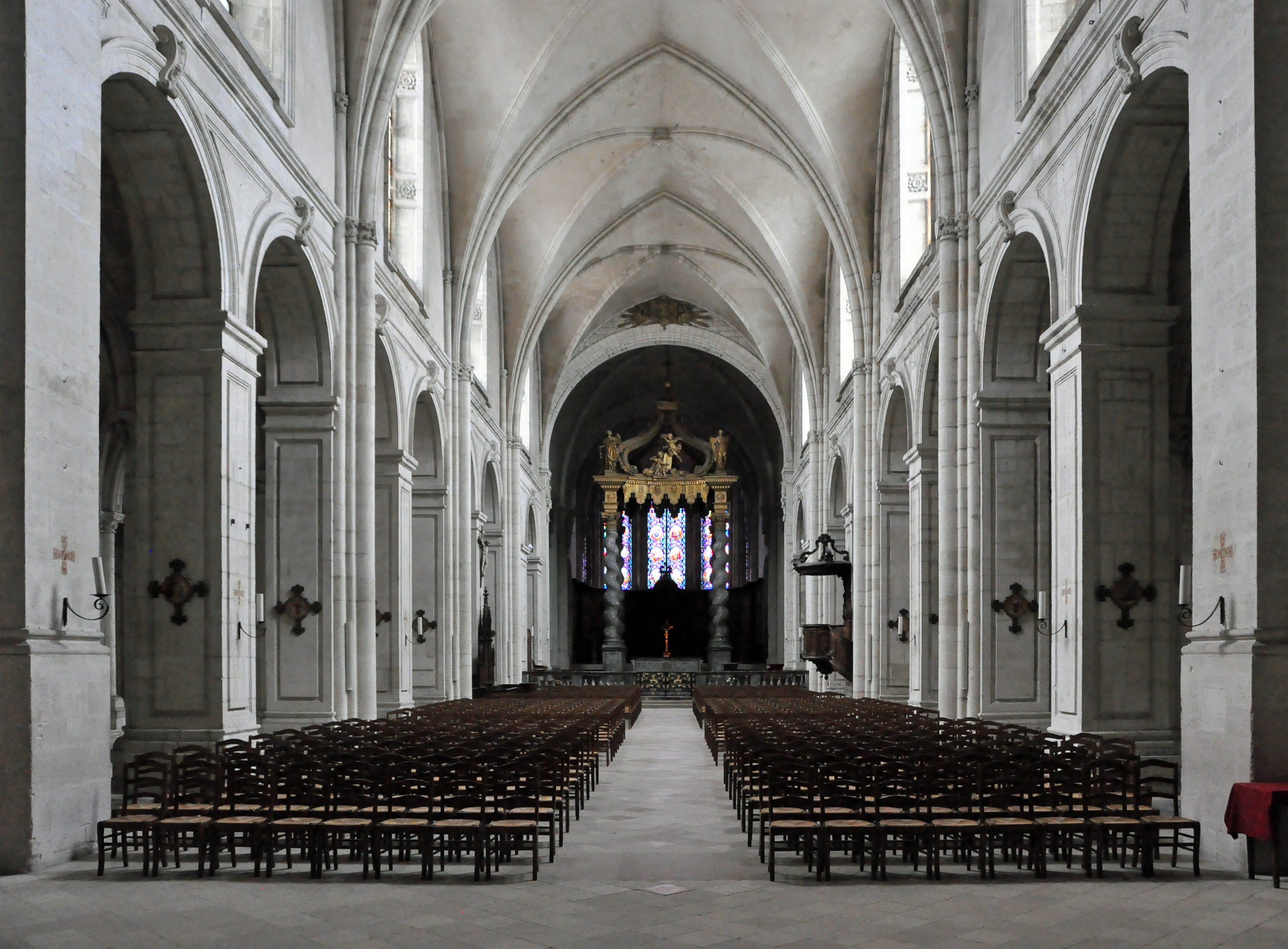
The nave

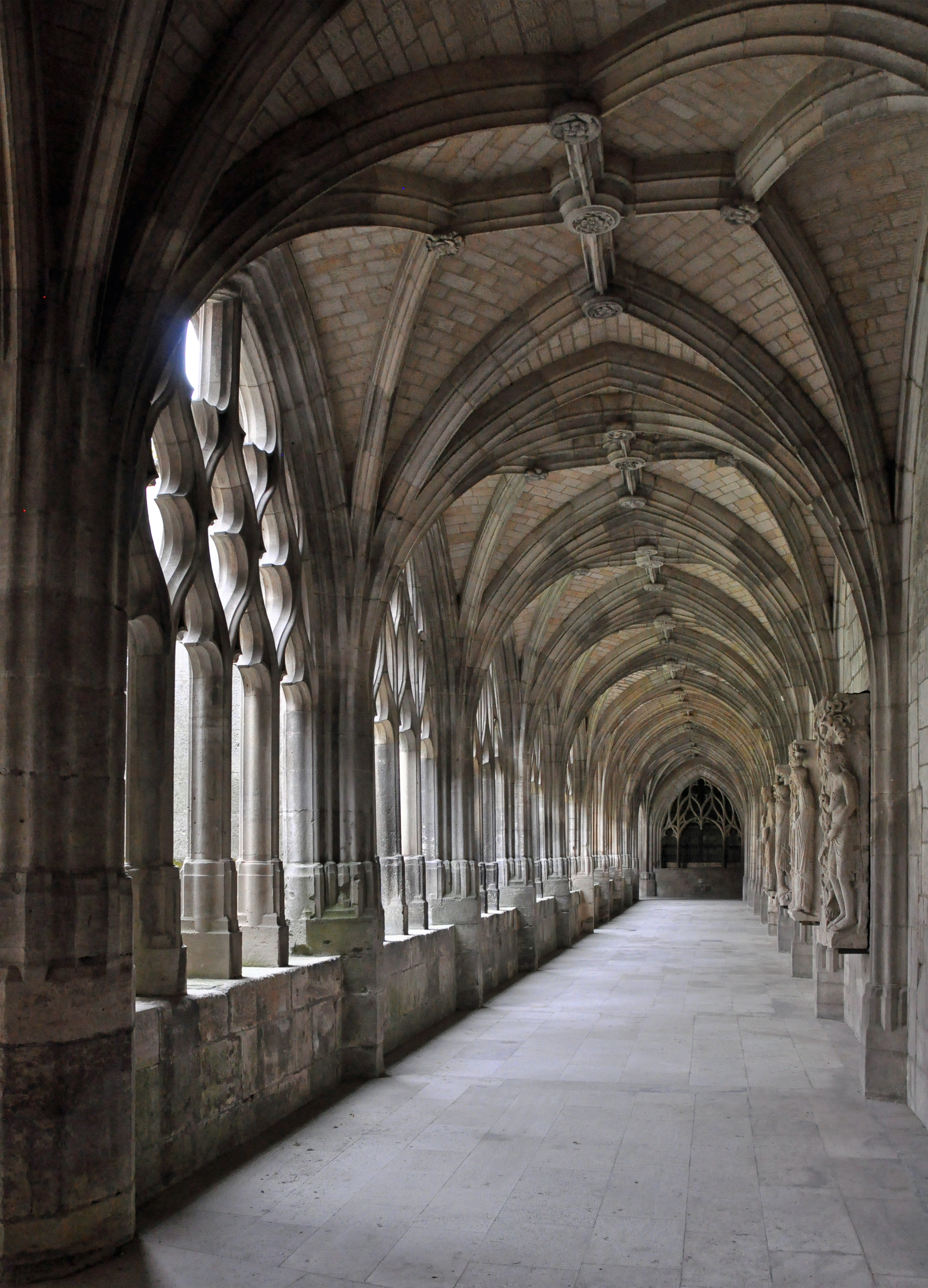
The cloister

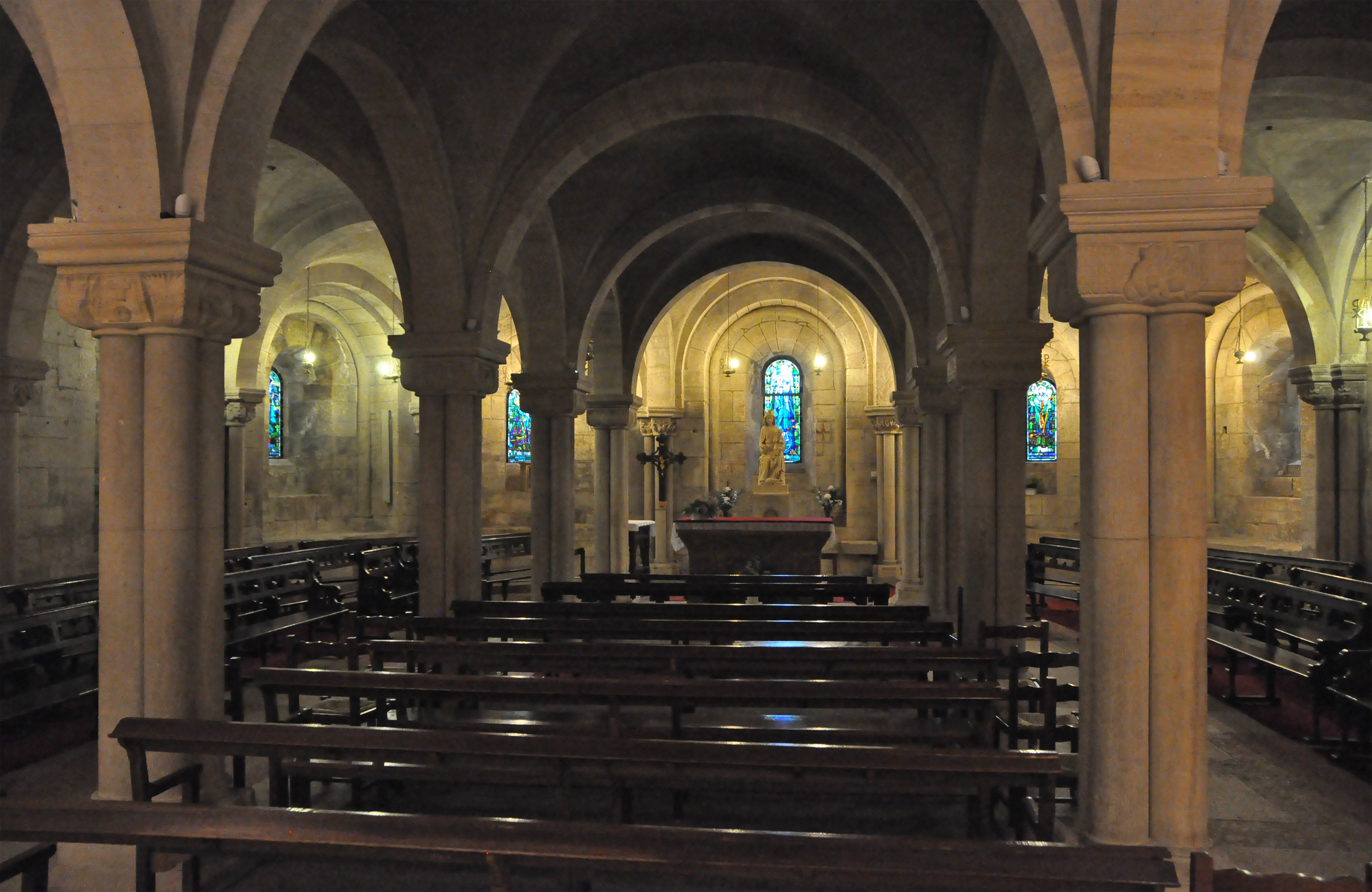
The crypt

== Sources ==
- Catholic Hierarchy: Diocese of Verdun
- Catholic Encyclopedia: Verdun
- Verdun Cathedral official website (in French)
