= Sankt Wendel =

- Town
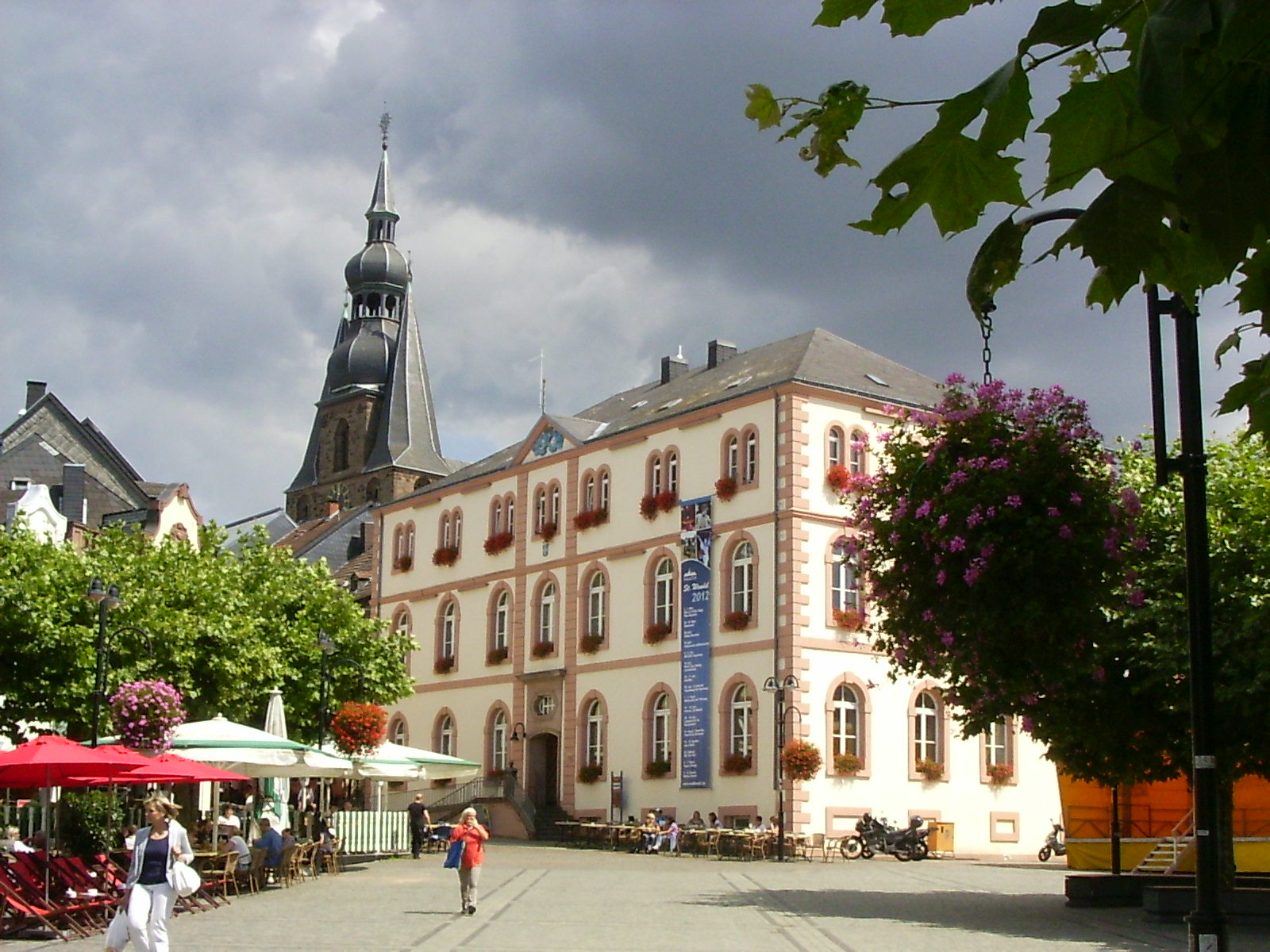

- Flag Coat of arms

- Location of Sankt Wendel within Sankt Wendel district
- Interactive map of Sankt Wendel
- Location within Germany Location within Saarland
- Coordinates: 49°28′N 7°10′E
- Country: Germany
- State: Saarland
- District: Sankt Wendel
- Subdivisions: 16

Government
  - Mayor (2015–25): Peter Klär (CDU)

Area
  - Total: 113.53 km^{2} (43.83 sq mi)
- Elevation: 260–400 m (850–1,310 ft)

Population (2025-12-31)
  - Total: 25,365
  - Density: 223.42/km^{2} (578.66/sq mi)
- Time zone: UTC+01:00 (CET)
  - Summer (DST): UTC+02:00 (CEST)
- Postal codes: 66606
- Dialling codes: 06851, 06854, 06856, 06858
- Vehicle registration: WND
- Website: www.sankt-wendel.de

St. Wendel (German pronunciation: [zaŋkt ˈvɛndl̩]; sometimes spelled in full as Sankt Wendel; Palatine German: Sankt Wennel [zaŋ(k)t ˈvɛ.nl̩]) is a town in northeastern Saarland. It is situated on the river Blies 36 km northeast of Saarbrücken, the capital of Saarland, and is named after Saint Wendelin of Trier. According to a survey by the German Association for Housing, Town Planning and Land Use Regulation, St. Wendel is known to be one of the wealthiest regions in Germany, behind Starnberg in Bavaria.

== Geography ==
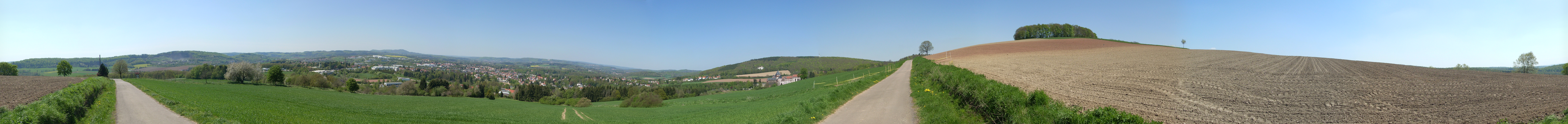
Panorama of St. Wendel

St. Wendel is situated on the river Blies west of the Bosenberg hill at an elevation of 938 feet (286 m). Its highest elevation is the Bosenberg hill at 1591 feet (485 m); the lowest is where the river Blies exits St. Wendel heading for Ottweiler at 853 feet (260 m).

== Demographics ==
(each year at December 31)

Year	1979	1983	1999	2006	2015
Population	28,431	28,211	27,174	26,967	26,066

== History ==
The center of St. Wendel supposedly was the farm of a feudal lord named Baso from the Merovingian period (late 6th century), so the town was originally named Basonevillare ('farm of Baso'). Baso's farm was situated on Bosenberg's western side between the river Todtbach and the river Bosenbach. This term would probably have developed into Bosenweiler were it not for the local admiration of Wendelin. (Compare the names Bosenweiler, Bosenberg and Bosenbach, in which Baso's name has survived.)

In the mid-7th century the Bishop of Verdun, Paulus, bought Basonvillare. He also inherited the settlement of Tholey (without the monastery) from the Merovingian nobleman Adalgisel Grimo, Deacon of Verdun. As a result, the St. Wendel area belonged to Verdun for centuries.

Shortly before that the hermit Wendelin died near Basonvillare. He had been highly venerated by the people, and as a result, an intense pilgrimage developed during the next few centuries, which finally resulted in the renaming of the settlement Basonvillare to St. Wendel in the 12th century.

The Lord of Blieskastel, whose properties stretched from the northern part of Lorraine all the way through the Hunsrück mountain chain to Bernkastel on the river Moselle (today Bernkastel-Kues), erected a castle surrounded by a moat in the valley of the Blies, which was intended to grant protection to the blooming pilgrimage site. The castle consisted of an artificial hill of earth with a wooden tower on top, surrounded by a palisade and a moat. Such an installation was called Mott, which is why this part of St. Wendel is named the Mott today.

A third area was a small church "above the grave of Wendelin", which supposedly was positioned where the Magdalenenkapelle ('chapel of Magdalena') is today. Not until the late 9th or early 10th century was a church built on the site of today's basilica, where the relics of Wendelin were taken during the 11th century and to which people make a pilgrimage on St. Wendel's day in October.

At the same time, the Wendel's Market developed, a central market for the area for cattle, clothing, and everyday utensils. Noble families and the clergy settled around the church. Castle, farm, and church gradually grew together in the 14th century.

Until the latter half of the 10th century, St. Wendel was an important outpost of Verdun. In 1326/28 the prince elector and Archbishop Balduin of Luxembourg from Trier bought the castle and the village of St. Wendel. He was trying to suppress the influence of Lorraine on the Rhine area. Through this purchase the village soon developed into a medieval town. Jakomin von Monkler became the first magistrate. As a representative of the prince elector, he had a new castle erected. In addition, he counseled Archbishop Balduin to create a new pilgrimage church. In 1332, he bought the city certificate from emperor Ludwig IV, gaining permanent revenues. His successor Werner von Falkenstein had a wall erected around the city in 1388. At this time about 500 people lived in St. Wendel.

While the Fruchtmarkt ('fruit market' – the area around the basilica) was a part of the town for the noble and clerical people in the 14th century, it became the central market place in the 15th century. Middle class and laborers settled on the former farms of noblemen. The guilds developed, gaining rights in the city administration through their jurors. In 1455 the municipal foundation, Hospitalstiftung, was erected, and a bit later the town hall was built. By the middle of the 15th century, the number of residents had climbed to 700.

In 1591 a huge part of the town was destroyed by fire. The residents had just started re-building the town when requisitions and contributions (payments to the occupation army) during the Thirty Years' War (1618–1648) almost drove the town into financial collapse.

During the Third Anglo-Dutch War (1672–1697) all buildings except for a few were burned down in 1677. The city wall was partly destroyed, and the prince elector's castle was devastated.

During the War of the Spanish Succession (1701–1714) the city was occupied and despoiled again. Commerce did not recover from that for a long time. Only in 1714 could people begin rebuilding.

Also during the War of the Polish Succession (1733–1738)), the War of the Austrian Succession (1740–1748) and the Seven Years' War (1756–1763) the troops marched through St. Wendel so requisitions had to be paid.

Only in the middle of the 18th century could the residents start to relax again. The development in urban building had long been marked by a huge contrast between the high population density of the wall-encircled city centre and the low population density outside the wall. Now the wall was gone and the city started to grow. Commerce, especially the wool and leather industries, grew again. There were huge companies with over 100 weaving machines. Merchants from Saarbrücken and Strassburg met their needs for good cloth while the tanneries took their products to the fair in Frankfurt. A wealthy upper class developed, as well as many gorgeous residential and commercial buildings. The basilica was provided with a three-layered baroque dome. Besides many urban building activities took place, for example roads, the area around the castle, moving the cemetery away from the basilica to outside the former city wall.

During the French revolutionary wars St. Wendel suffered plundering and requisitions from the troops of both sides. Wool weavers and tanners had to pay socage, a special kind of tax. The introduction of freedom of trade replaced the old rules of the guilds, putting many masters out of business, as prices were no longer fixed so plunderers could work below price.

From 1798, the canton St. Wendel belonged to the French Saardepartement. Eventually wealth was returning to the slowly but surely growing town. In the Kelsweilerstrasse, the upper city gate was broken down and a bridge over the river Blies was erected in today's Bahnhofstrasse.

In 1814, Duke Ernst III of Saxe-Coburg-Saalfeld (later Duke Ernest I of Saxe-Coburg and Gotha) received the cantons St. Wendel, Grumbach and Baumholder (together about 20,000 residents) for his performance during the French Revolutionary Wars. Beginning in 1816 he called this area the "Principality of Lichtenberg", which is still seen today in the borders of the evangelical church community of St. Wendel.

The government was economically successful, but it tried to control the jurisdiction, and the trust of the Lichtenbergers in their independent government disappeared. Creating a Landrat (senate for the district), the general public hoped to gain rights for self-rule, tax politics, etc., but Duke Ernst decided arbitrarily in too many cases. The general public became more and more dissatisfied, resulting in uprisings. During the liberal movements resulting from the Hambacher Fest in 1832, the uprisings escalated. The revolts were put down with the help of Prussian troops from Saarlouis. In 1834 the duke sold the land to the Kingdom of Prussia and St. Wendel became a chief town of the administrative district of Trier. The Prussian state stationed a garrison in St. Wendel.

Economically the St. Wendel area was poor until the middle of the 19th century, which is why so many people emigrated to America. Even today, there are towns in Brazil where the local German dialect of St. Wendel or even the surrounding villages is still spoken.

In the middle of the 19th century, the town of St. Wendel and the nearby villages Alsfassen and Breiten slowly grew together. Today's Bahnhofstrasse, which leads to Niederweiler (the area of today's train station), was built, as well as the Brühlstrasse and the Kelsweilerstrasse, which also lead to Breiten and Alsfassen. In 1859, St. Wendel, Breiten and Alsfassen were finally united into the new town of St. Wendel. Other urban building actions: street lights, a hospital, an evangelical church (1841).

The economic situation of St. Wendel changed in 1860 with the opening of the railroad between Bingen and Saarbrücken, with St. Wendel profiting as a train station and the building of a train maintenance company. The train maintenance company was first situated opposite the station on the Tholeyerberg; between 1913 and 1915 it was moved to the Schwarzer Weg (today Werkstrasse). Today the area is used by the Bundeswehr as an army maintenance logistic center.

In 1898 the Divine Word Missionaries built a huge mission in St. Wendel. Also, as a reaction to the changes in economic and social structures, a major town expansion began, causing the inhabited area to double in size between 1910 and 1937.

During the Third Reich, a huge military base was built near the western town border beside Highway B269 to Winterbach. The town was captured by the US 7th Army in March 1945, the US 10th Armored Division briefly establishing its command post there on 19 March.

After the World War II another big expansion of the town came during the Wirtschaftswunder. Saarland remained a French protectorate independent from Germany until its re-integration into the Bundesrepublik Deutschland in 1957, which began an economic downturn as the largest employer of St. Wendel, the Marschall Tobacco Company, had to close down in 1960.

Despite all the wars, there were still some historic buildings left in the town centre of St. Wendel until 1960, but under mayors Franz Gräff (1956–1974) and Jakob Feller (1974–1982), a lack of historic interest and economically oriented sanitation destroyed a lot of them. Parts of the medieval town are still to be recognized near the Wendelsdom (the basilica).

St. Wendel nowadays has about 26,000 residents due to a district reform in 1974 in which several surrounding villages were united with the town area.

A French garrison stayed in St. Wendel from 1951 to July 1999. Their buildings are used by different companies today, and some have been removed. In their place, a golf course, a skating park and a new public swimming have been built.

=== Religion ===
While the upper Blies Valley (which contains St. Wendel) is mostly Catholic, the rest of the Blies Valley has about as many Catholics as Protestants. The Ostertal ('Oster Valley') is mostly Protestant. In the town centre there are two Catholic churches (St. Wendelin and St. Anna) plus the Evangelical congregation.

=== Town divisions / surrounding villages ===
- 1859: Alsfassen and Breiten
- 1974: Niederlinxweiler, Oberlinxweiler, Remmesweiler, Winterbach, Bliesen and Urweiler in the valley Bliestal plus Leitersweiler, Osterbrücken, Hoof, Marth, Niederkirchen, Saal, Bubach, Werschweiler and Dörrenbach in the Ostertal valley.

== Politics ==
=== Town council ===
The communal elections on May 25, 2014 produced these results:

- CDU: 62.8% (26 seats)
- SPD: 26.1% (10 seats)
- Die Grünen: 4.1% (1 seat)

Traditionally the CDU has been the strongest power in town, governing in each period with an absolute majority.

=== Mayors ===
- Carl Wilhelm Rechlin, 1835–1869
- Carl August Theodor Müller, 1869–1893
- Karl Alfred Friedrich, 1894–1918
- Heinrich Mettlich, 1919–1920
- Dr. Emil Flory, 1921–1935
- Kurt August Eichner, 1. December 1935 - 19. March 1945 (NSDAP)
- Jakob Fuchs, Christian party of the people of the Saarland (CVP), 1946–1956
- Franz Gräff, CDU, 1956–1974
- Jakob Feller, CDU, 1974–1982
- Klaus Bouillon, CDU, 1983 - 2014
- Peter Klär, CDU, since 2015

=== Coat of arms ===
The coat of arms of the town of Sankt Wendel combines elements of the Scottish flag and the Scottish coat of arms. Four lilies, taken from the Scottish royal coat of arms, on a blue background, are reminiscent of Saint Wendelin. Legendary tradition describes him as a Scottish king's son. In 1465, the parish of St. Wendel sent two parishioners to Scotland to research the legend of Saint Wendelin's royal Scottish origins. After allegedly positive confirmation, the Scottish lion coat of arms was used in the seal of the parish of St. Wendel.

== Twin towns – sister cities ==
Sankt Wendel is twinned with:

- Rezé, France (1973)
- São Vendelino, Brazil (2003)
- (Republic of Ireland) Balbriggan, Ireland (2007)

== Economy and infrastructure ==
=== Transport ===
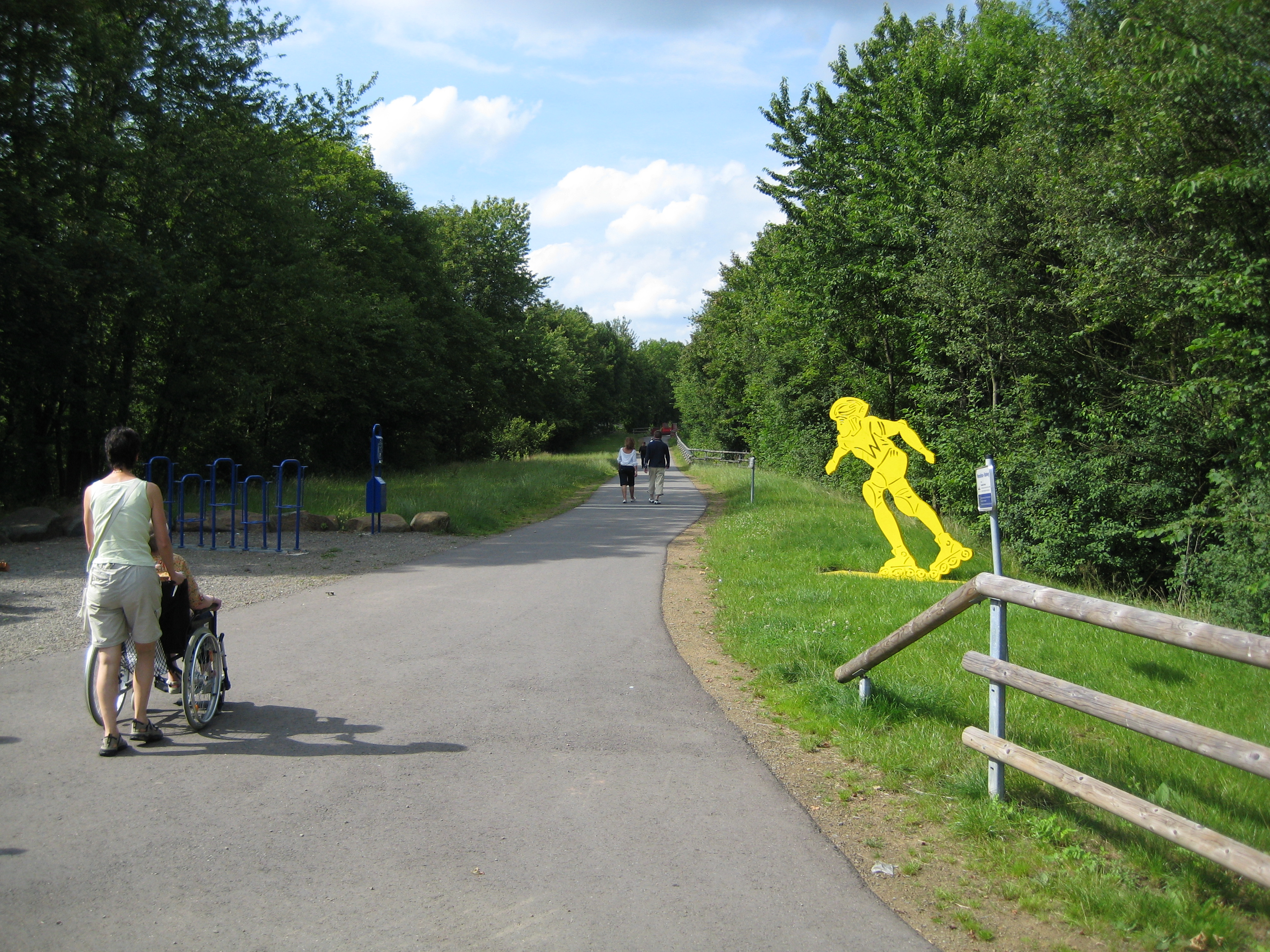
Wendalinus cycle track, start near St. Wendel

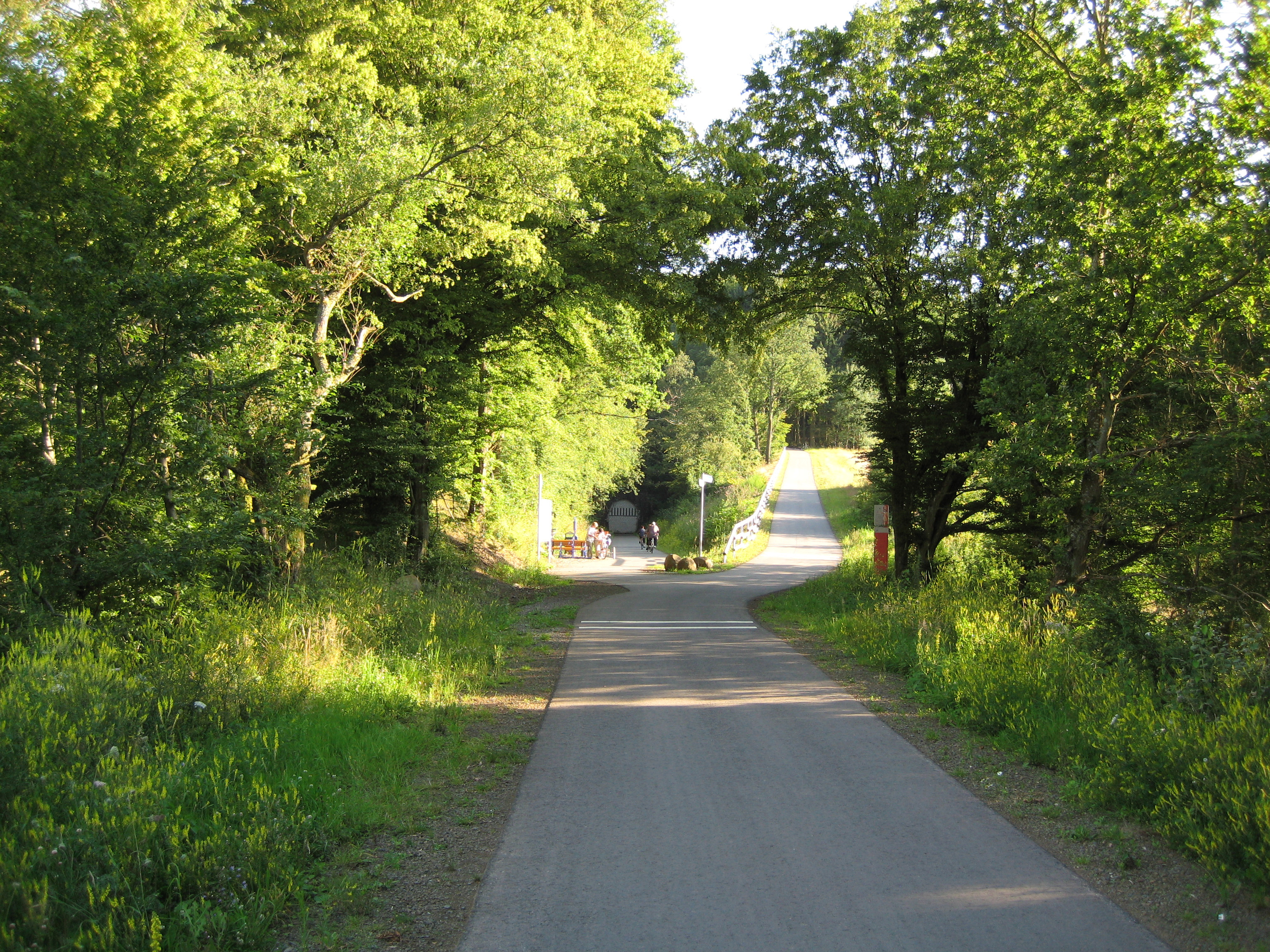
Wendalinus cycle track, ascension near Tholey

The next highways are about 20 minutes away by car in each direction:

- Autobahn (Highway) 1: Fehmarn – Saarbrücken
- Autobahn (Highway) 8: Luxembourg – Salzburg
- Autobahn (Highway) 62: Nonnweiler – Pirmasens

All regional express trains and regional trains stop at St. Wendel station. Therefore, an hourly connection to the Rhine Main Area and three hourly connections to the capital of the Saarland, Saarbrücken are available.

Since 1915, there has been a single track connection through the suburbs Bliesen and Oberthal to Tholey. In 1984, passenger traffic was shut down on this track.

The entire track from St. Wendel to Tholey has been rebuilt into an asphalt-covered cycle track named Wendalinus-Radweg.

=== Business and industry ===
- Industry: metal, medical (Fresenius Medical Care), electronics (since 1987 headquarters of Hughes & Kettner)
- Trade: company headquarters of supermarket chain Globus, whose founder Franz Bruch came from St. Wendel

=== Courts ===
St. Wendel has a district court, which belongs to the regional court of Saarbrücken

== Sports ==
St. Wendel has been an organizer of the 2005 and 2011 UCI Cyclo-cross World Championships. St. Wendel with his Wendelinuspark circuit is host of the Supermoto World, Europe & German Championships.

=== Clubs and organizations ===
- 1861 St. Wendel e. V. gymnastics club
- St. Wendel e. V diving club
- SV Blau - Weiß St. Wendel football club
- FC 1910 St. Wendel e. V football club
- Nordsaar motorbike club

== Culture ==
=== Museums ===
- St. Wendel in the Mia Münster House town museum – exhibits the works of an artist from St. Wendel named Mia Münster, plus various local artists
- Missions- und völkerkundliches Museum of the Divine Word Missionaries
- Heimatmuseum in the old town hall
- Heimatmuseum in Dörrenbach – in the smallest village of St. Wendel, Dörrenbach, there is a museum documenting the everyday culture of the village and the way of life of former farming village residents.

=== Cultural projects ===
- Street of Sculptures. In 1971 St. Wendel sculptor Leo Kornbrust initiated the International Sculpture Symposium St. Wendel, now well known throughout Europe, which brought forth numerous huge stone sculptures by different international artists. In 1979 the sculptures were arranged along 25 kilometers of the Saarland hiking trail from St. Wendel to Lake Bostal.
- Wendelswoche ('Wendel's week'). Since the beginning of the 11th century many believers have made pilgrimages to the grave of Wendelin in the Wendalinusbasilica at the beginning of October.
- Oster- und Weihnachtsmarkt (Easter and Christmas markets).
- WND JAZZ. Once a year an international jazz festival takes place whose specialty is a meeting of the local and the international jazz scenes.
- Internationaler Wettbewerb der Straßenzauberer ('International competition of street magicians').

== Sightseeing ==
=== Buildings ===
- Wendalinusbasilica
- Wendel's chapel (1755)
- Mia-Münster-House
- Fruchtmarkt ("fruit market")
- Mission building of Divine Word Missionaries

== Notable people ==
- Wendelin of Trier (c. 600), abbot of Tholey and hermit in St. Wendel
- Pierre Antoine François Huber (1775–1832), French general
- Philipp Jakob Riotte (1776–1856), composer and kapellmeister
- Helene Demuth (1820–1890), housekeeper and testamentary executor of Karl Marx
- Nicola Marschall (1829–1917), German-American artist, designed the original Confederate flag
- Mia Münster (1894–1970), artist
- Paul Tholey (1937–1998), psychologist
- Siegmund Nimsgern (1940–2025), opera singer
- Matthias Maurer (born 1970), ESA astronaut
- Sebastian Reinert (born 1987), footballer
- Sebastian Schorr (born 1989), politician
- Selina Wagner (born 1990), footballer
- Jennifer Haben (born 1995), singer, former member of Saphir and member of Beyond The Black

=== Honorary citizens ===
- Herwarth von Bittenfeld (1796–1884), commanding general of the 8th army corps
- Clemens Freiherr von Schorlemer-Lieser (1856–1922), royal state minister and minister for agriculture, domains and forest
- Max Müller (1862–1937), mayor of Wadern
- Pater Alois Selzer (1893–1968), professor of pedagogy and sociology at the theological college of the order in Mölding near Vienna
- Hans-Klaus Schmitt (1900–1982), chief of police

== Gallery ==
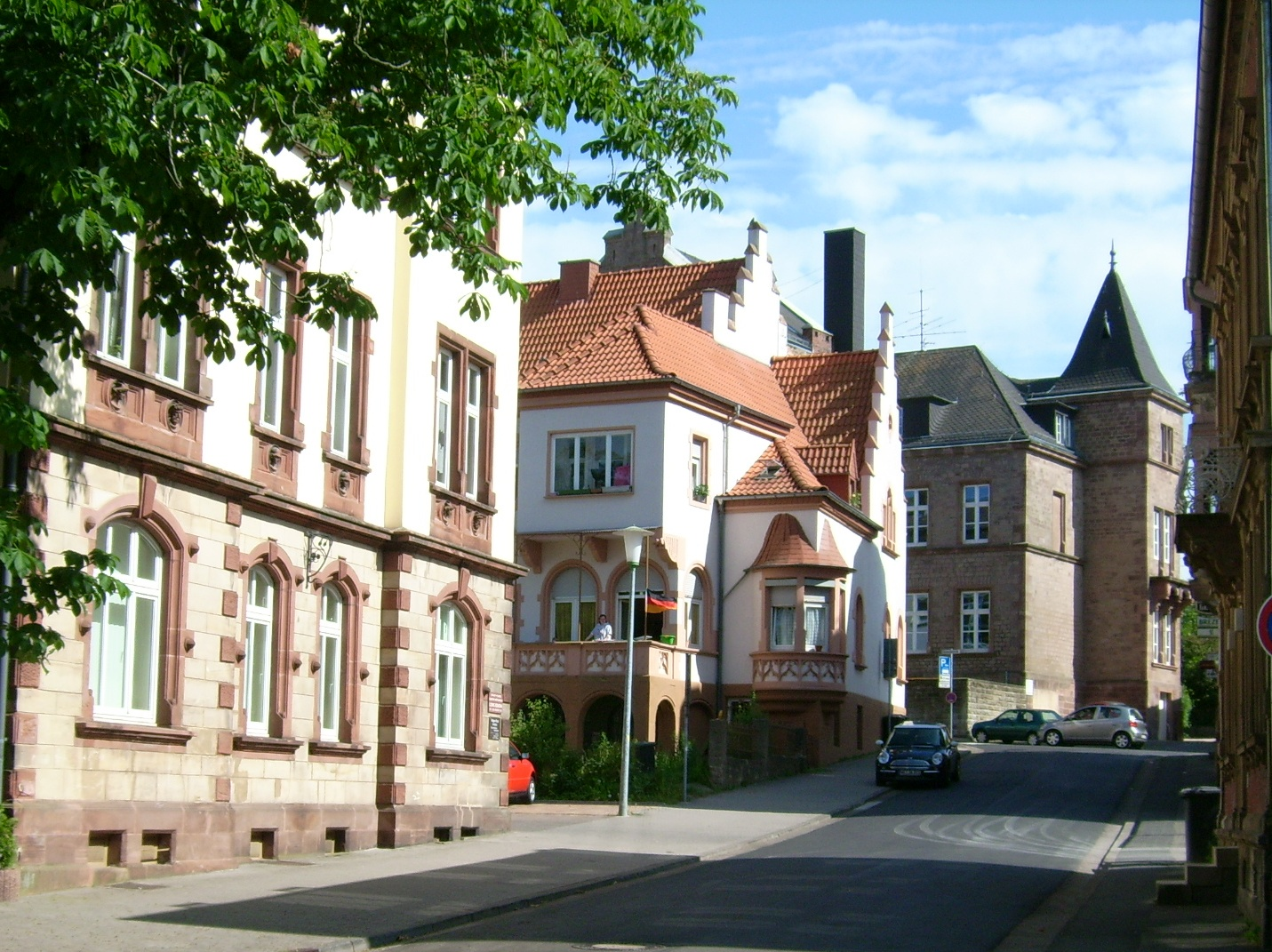
Town of St. Wendel

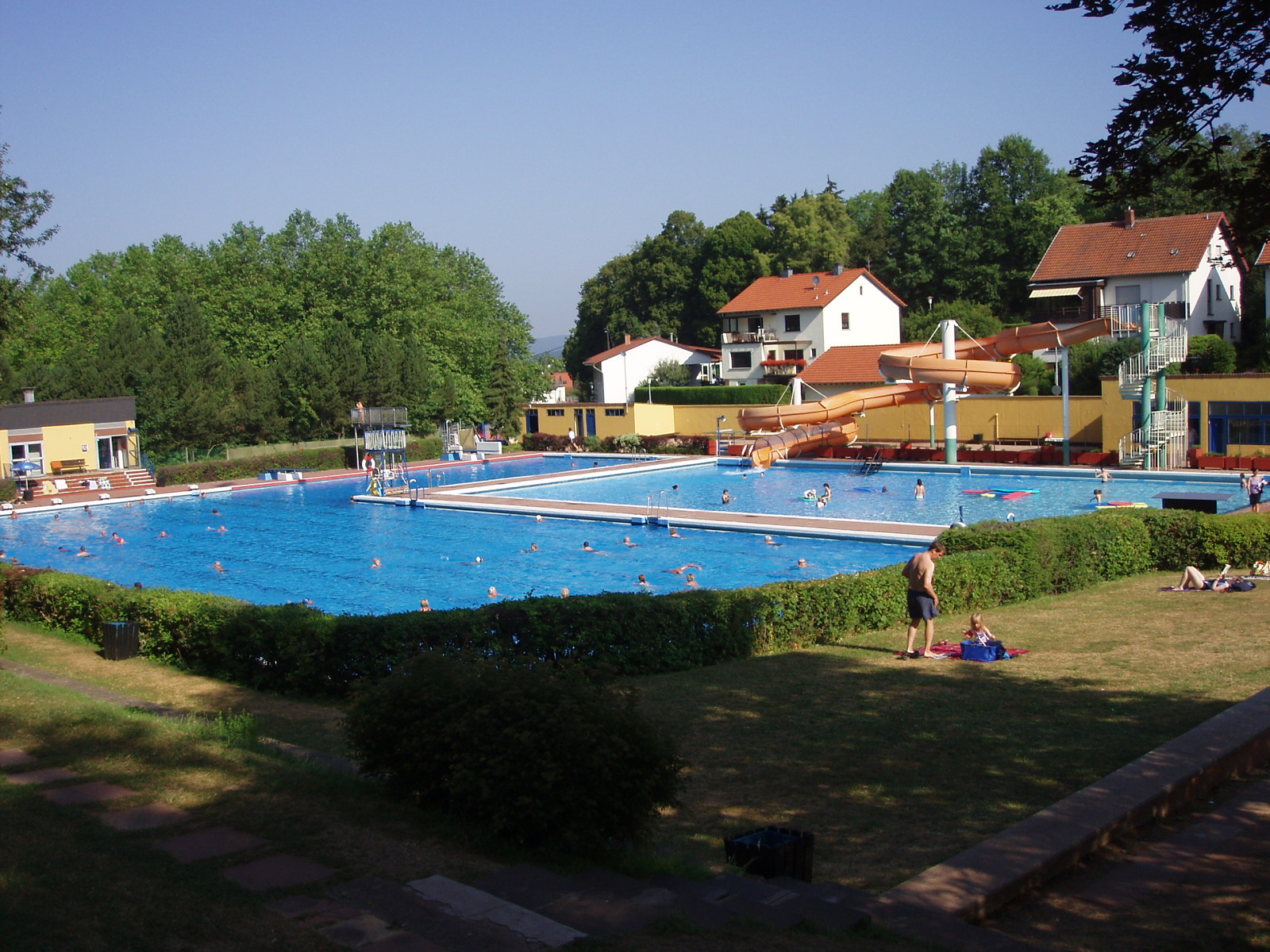
Open air swimming pool

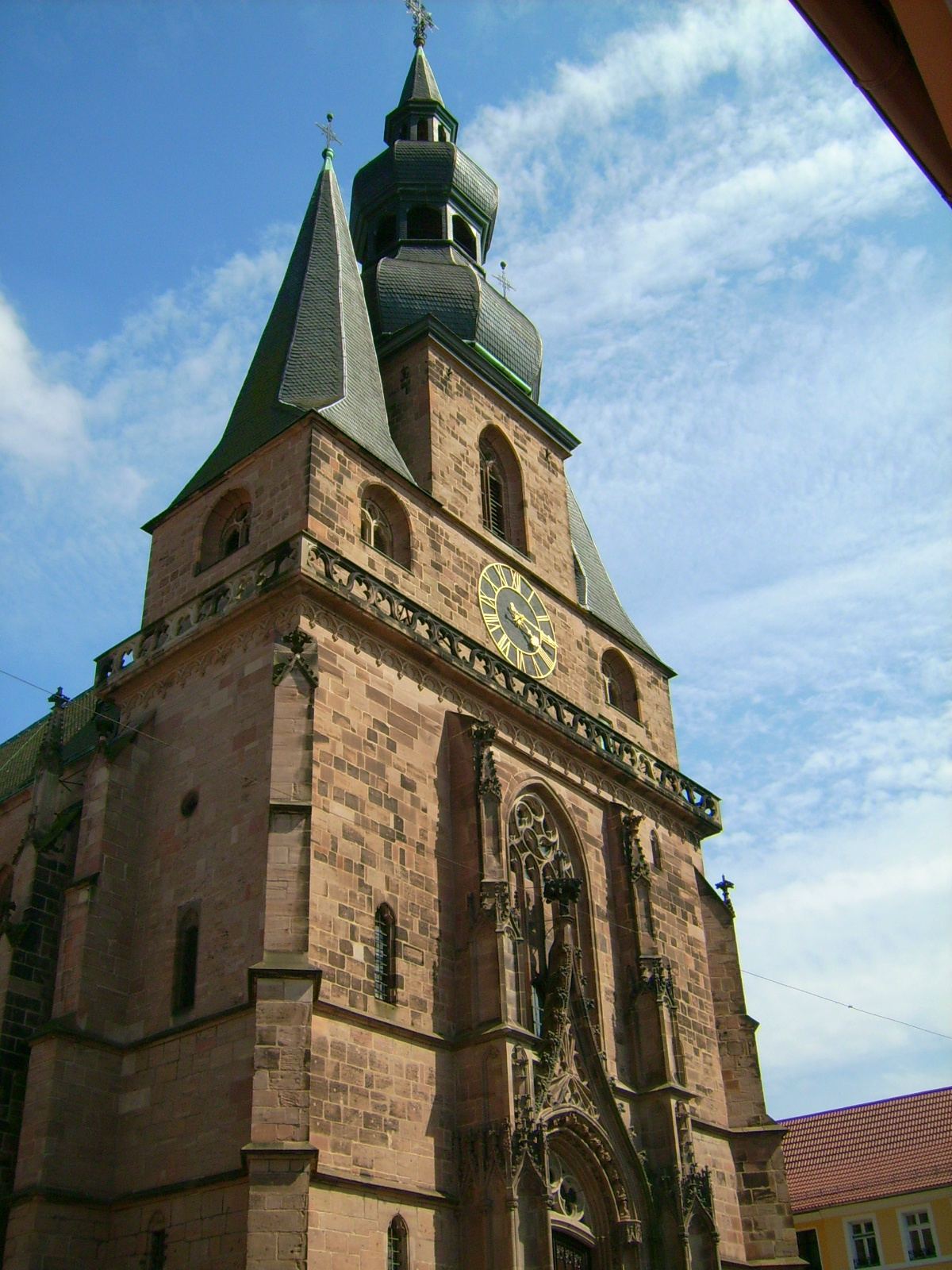
Wendalinusbasilica

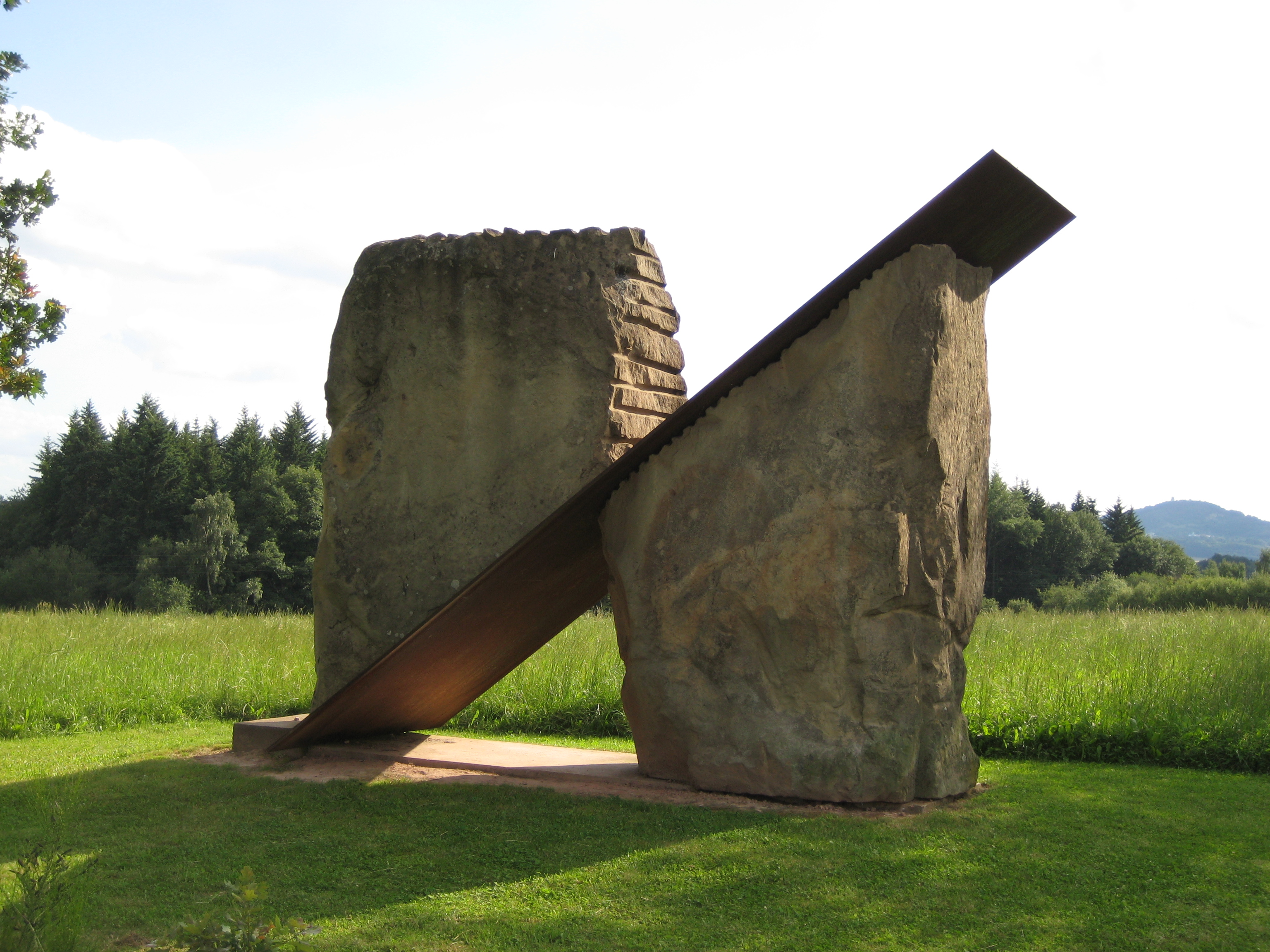
Street of Sculptures

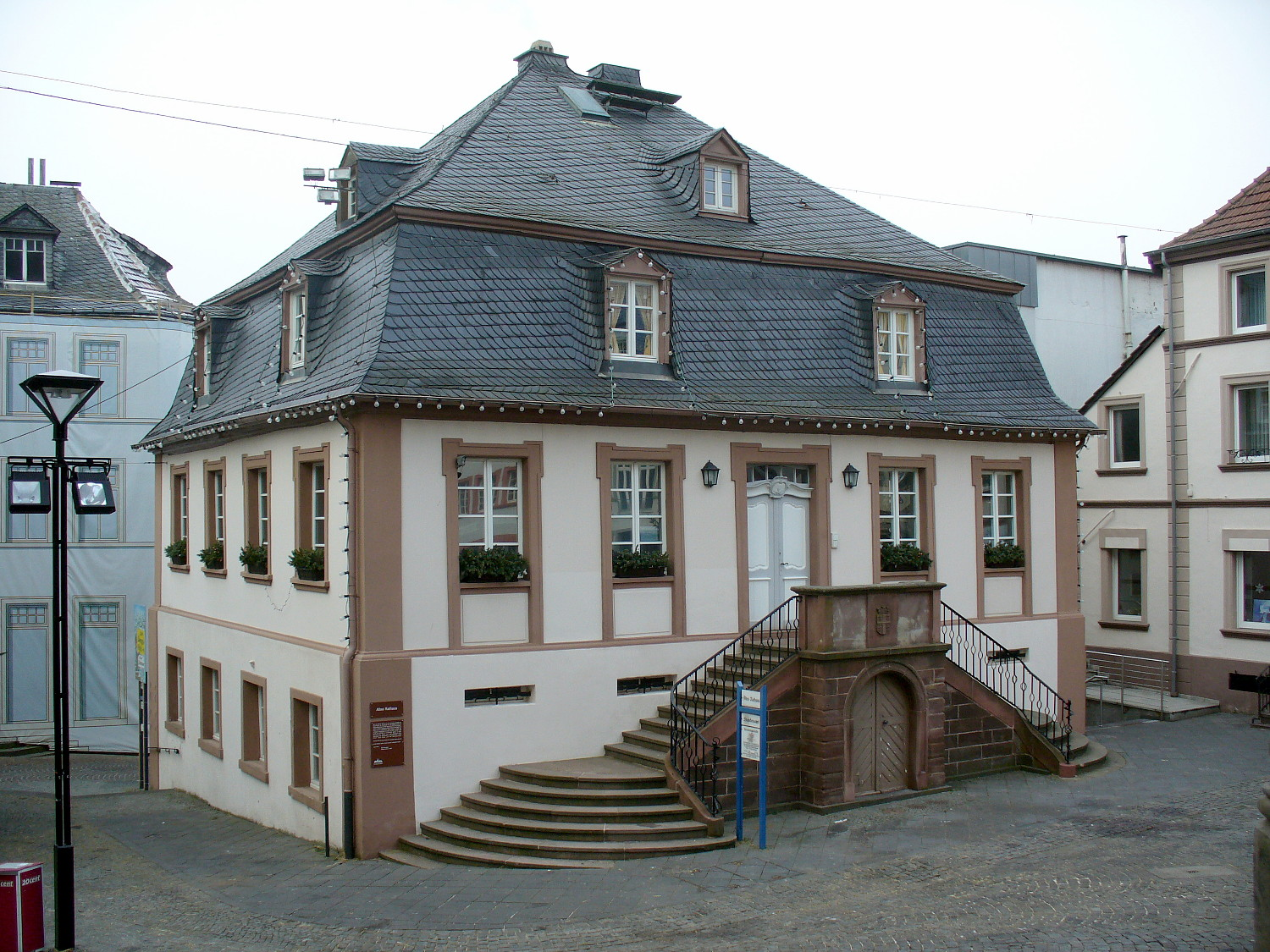
Old town hall
