= Lost in Forever =

Lost in Forever may refer to:

- "Lost in Forever" (song), a 2012 song by P.O.D. from Murdered Love
- Lost in Forever (album), a 2016 album by Beyond the Black
