= Songs of Love and Death =

Songs of Love and Death may refer to:

- Songs of Love and Death (Emm Gryner album), 2005
- Songs of Love and Death (Beyond the Black album), 2015
- Songs of Love and Death (anthology), an anthology of short stories, edited by George R. R. Martin and Gardner Dozois
