= Beyond the Black =

German symphonic metal band

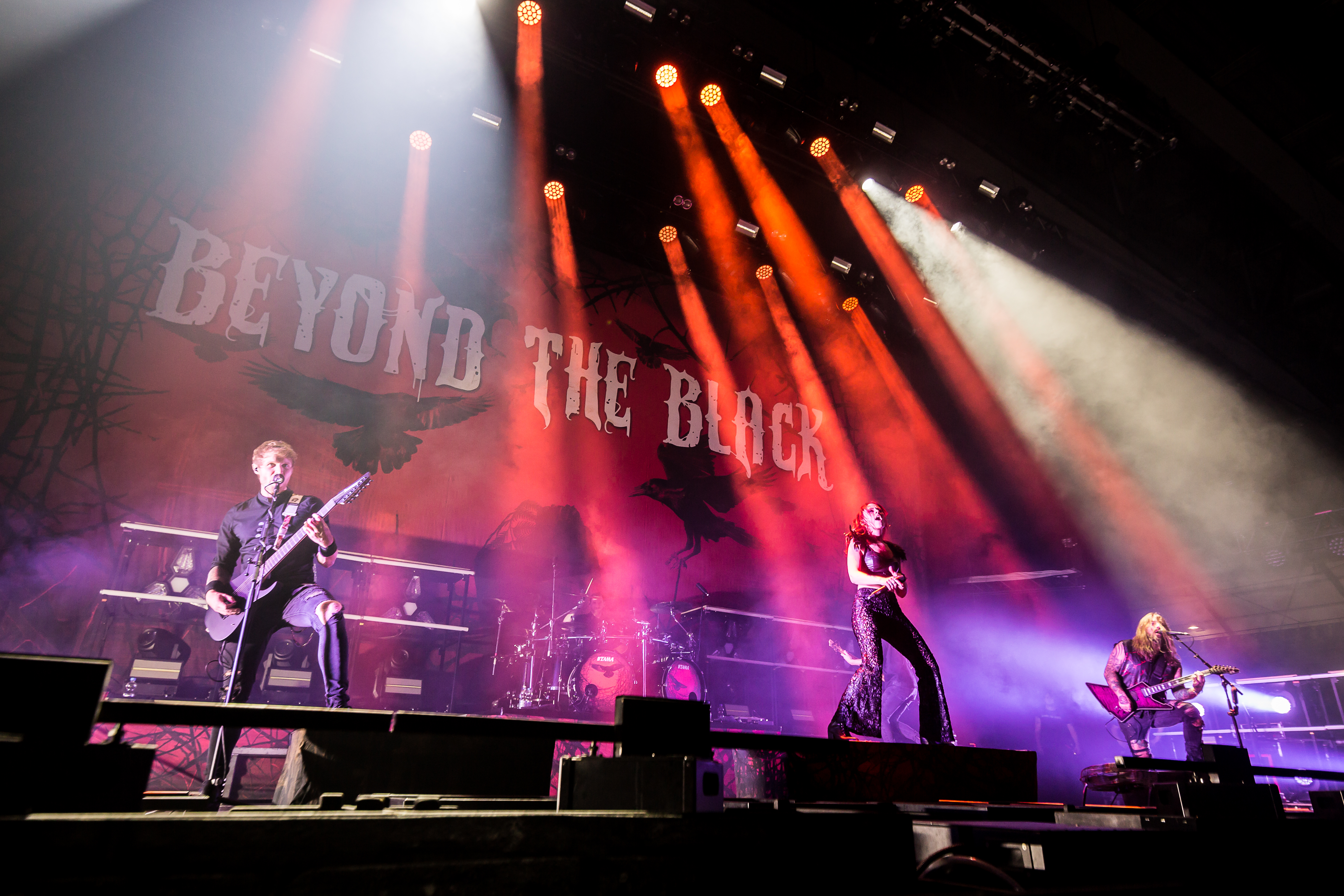
- Beyond the Black performing at Arena Leipzig in 2023

Background information
- Origin: Mannheim, Germany
- Genres: Symphonic metal
- Years active: 2014–present
- Labels: Airforce1 Records, Napalm Records, Nuclear Blast
- Members: Jennifer Haben; Kai Tschierschky; Tobi Lodes; Chris Hermsdörfer
- Past members: Stefan Herkenhoff; Nils Lesser; Christopher Hummels; Tobias Derer; Erwin Schmidt; Michael Hauser; Jonas Roßner
- Website: beyond-the-black.com

Beyond the Black is a German symphonic metal band formed in 2014 in Mannheim. Their debut album Songs of Love and Death became popular immediately after the release, and entered the German and Austrian national music charts.

== History ==
=== 2014–2016: Beginnings, Songs of Love and Death, and Lost in Forever ===
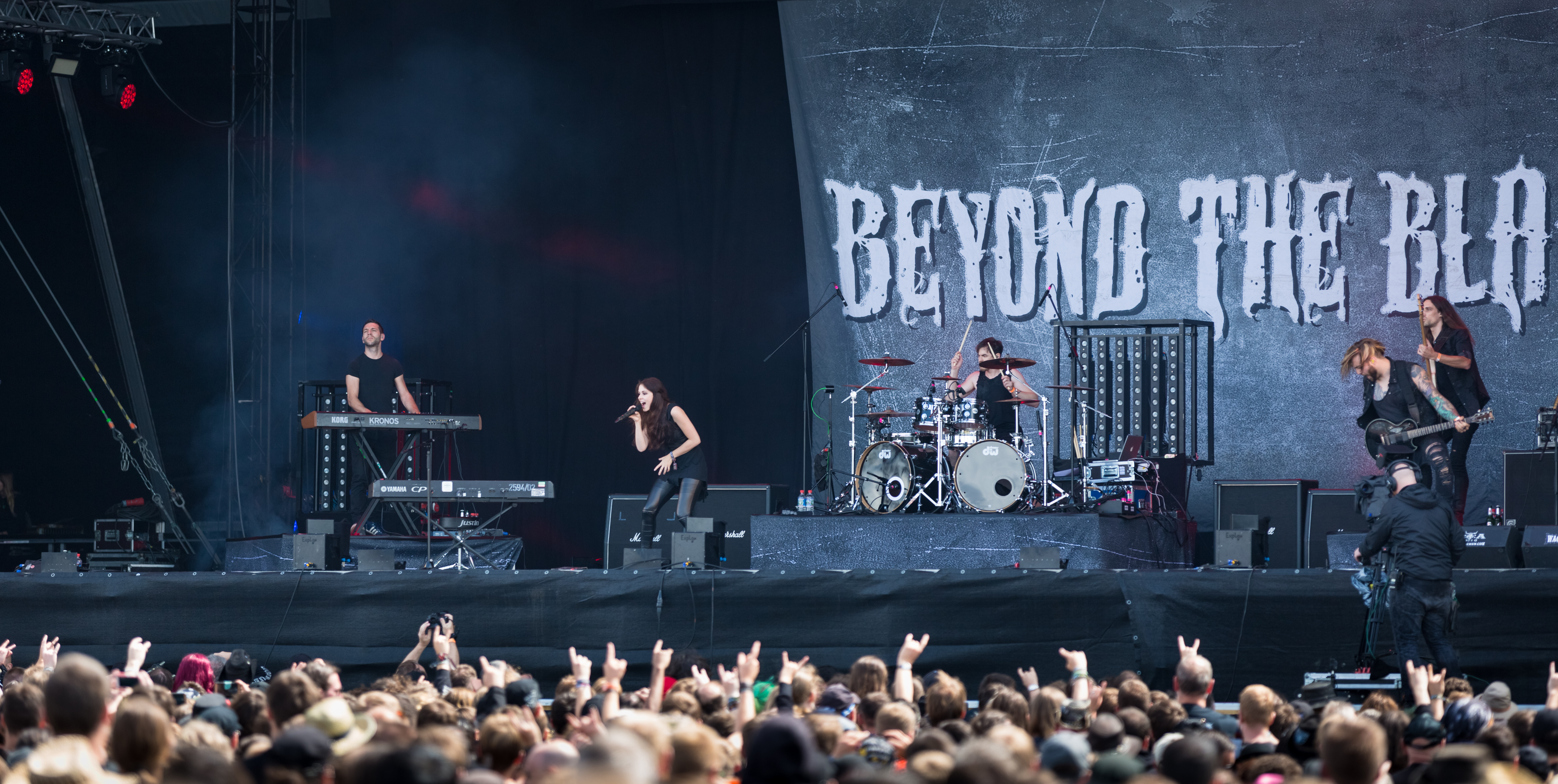
Beyond the Black performing at Wacken Open Air in 2016.

The band was formed in 2014 in Mannheim, Germany by Jennifer Haben (vocalist, ex-Saphir). After finishing the production of Beyond the Black's first album together with her producers, Haben engaged Nils Lesser (lead guitar, Cypecore), Christopher Hummels (rhythm guitar/backing vocals), Michael Hauser (keyboards), Erwin Schmidt (bass) and Tobias Derer (drums) as live musicians. They made their first appearances at the Wacken Open Air 2014 festival and on tour supporting Saxon and Hell.

On 13 February 2015, Beyond the Black released their debut full-length album Songs of Love and Death, which reached the 12th place in the German music charts and 21st place in the Austrian charts. The album was produced by Sascha Paeth (Avantasia) and received mostly positive reviews from critics. A week later, on February 20, the band appeared on the German Sat.1 Breakfast television with the song "In the Shadows".

From 13 May 2015, the band embarked on its first tour through Germany, including an appearance at the Wave-Gotik-Treffen on May 23, 2015 and several more festivals in Germany, Austria and Switzerland.

Beyond the Black's second album, titled Lost in Forever, was released on the 12 February 2016 and features 13 tracks. The deluxe edition features 9 live songs (including an unreleased cover), an interview and an interactive menu.

On 15 July 2016, the band announced that Jennifer Haben and her musicians were parting ways. Haben continued the band with new members. The new band line-up (Kai Tschierschky (drums), Tobi Lodes (rhythm guitar), Chris Hermsdörfer (lead guitar), Stefan Herkenhoff (bass) and Jonas Roßner (keyboards)) was announced in November 2016 and organized as a permanent-member band from this time on.

=== 2017–present: Albums with new lineup ===
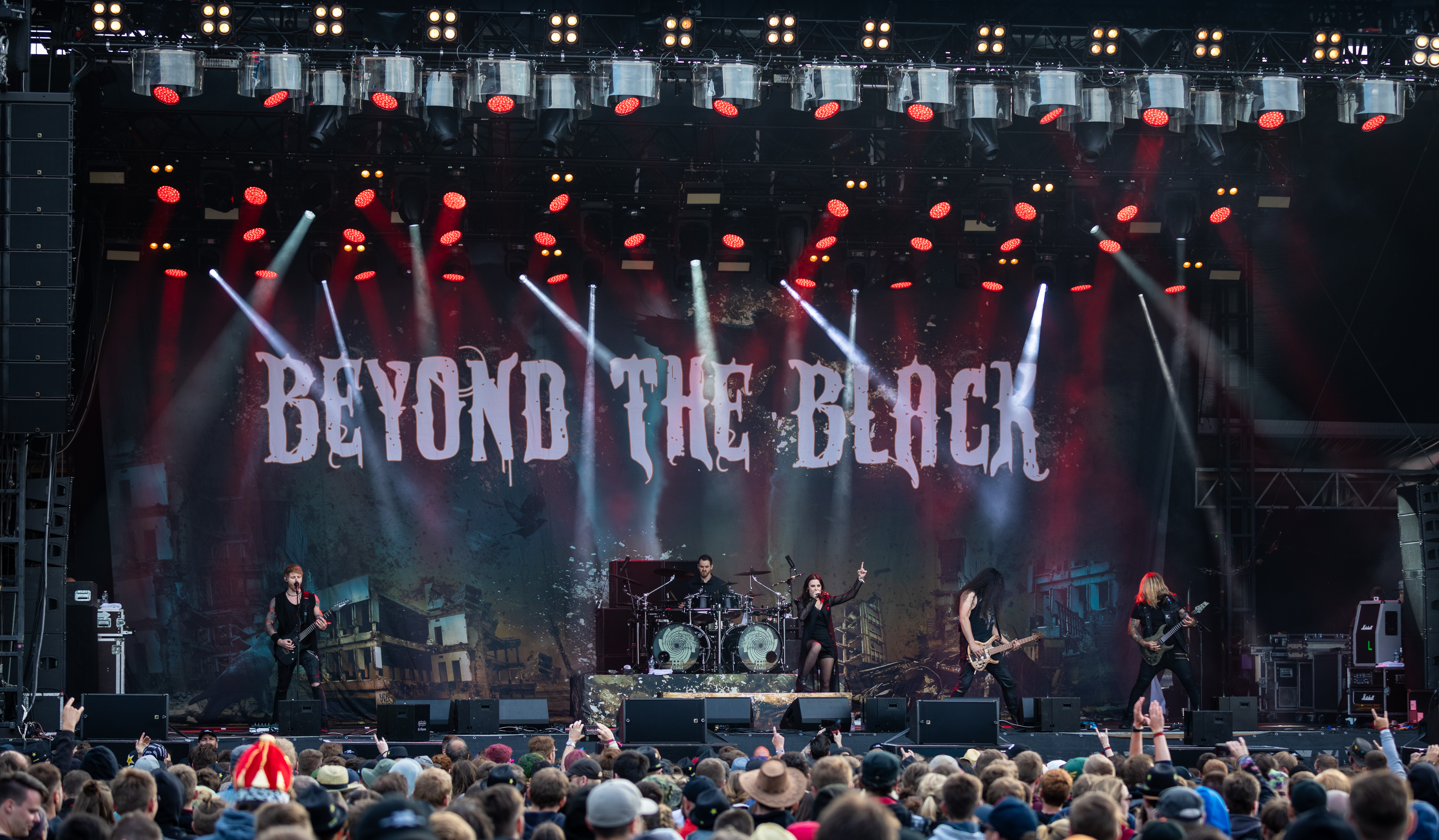
Beyond the Black live at Rock am Ring 2019

On 13 January 2017, the band's second album Lost In Forever was released as a Tour Edition with additional song material. Beyond the Black started touring internationally then with shows in the UK, Czech Republic, Poland, Russia and Japan. In 2017, the band also toured as a support act for Aerosmith and Scorpions.

In spring 2018, keyboardist Jonas Roßner left Beyond the Black for private reasons. On 31 August 2018, their third album Heart of the Hurricane was released, followed by an extensive European tour as support for the Dutch symphonic metal band Within Temptation till the end of the year.

In 2019, the band released a Black Edition of their album Heart of the Hurricane with three new songs and went on a European headline tour, which has mainly sold out.

On 19 June 2020, Beyond the Black released their fourth album Hørizøns, reaching the bands highest chart positions to date. In the course of the release, the band announced a European co-headline tour together with the Swedish/Danish metal band Amaranthe.

In July 2022, they took part in the 4 days rock fest "Midalidare - Rock in the Wine Valley", on the evening of Within Temptation.

On 9 September 2022, Amaranthe released an alternate single version (including a lyric video) of their song "Make It Better", with Haben as a guest singer. The band released their self-titled fifth album on 13 January 2023. This was followed by their sixth album, Break the Silence, released on 9 January 2026.

== Band members ==
Beyond the Black in 2023

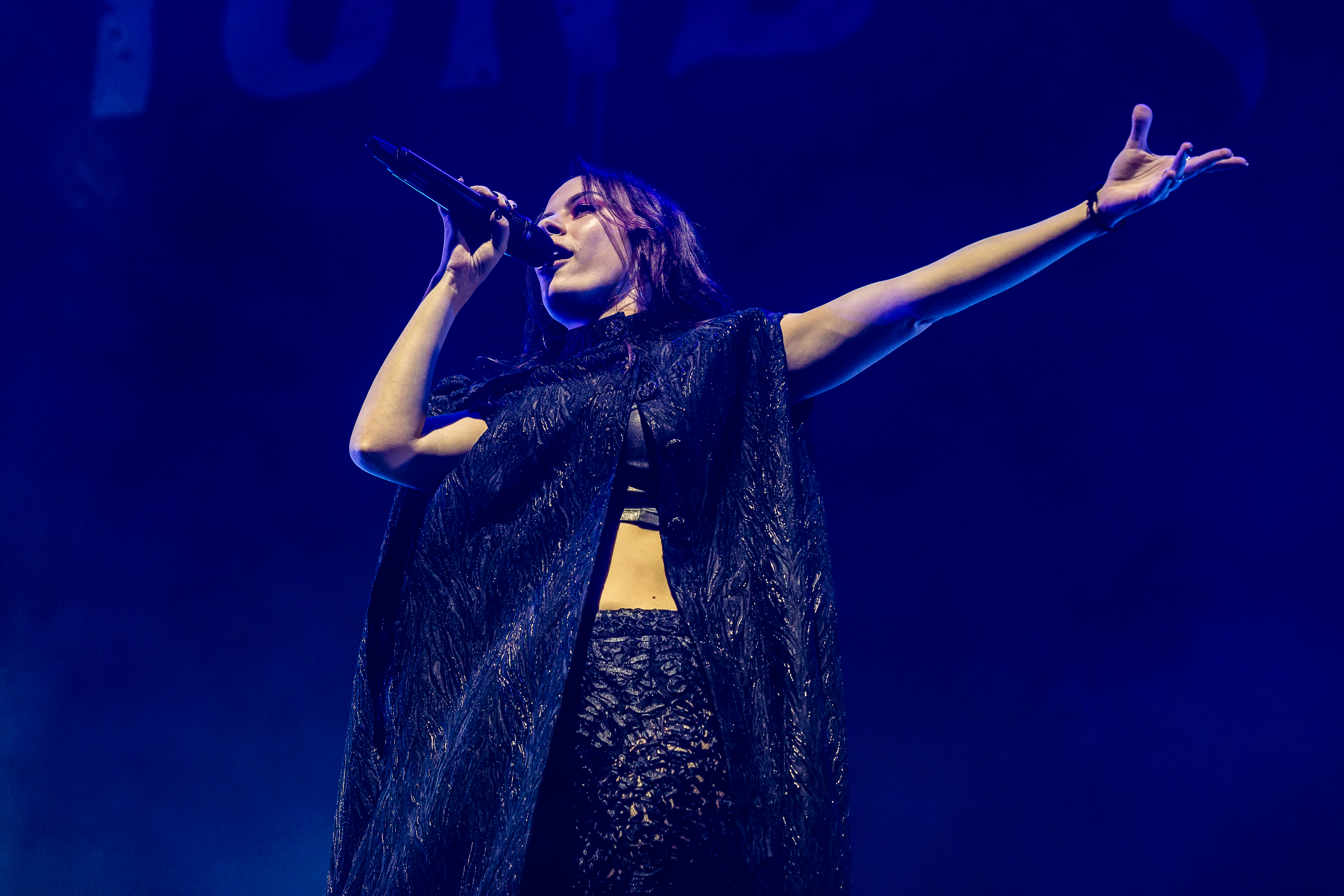
Jennifer Haben

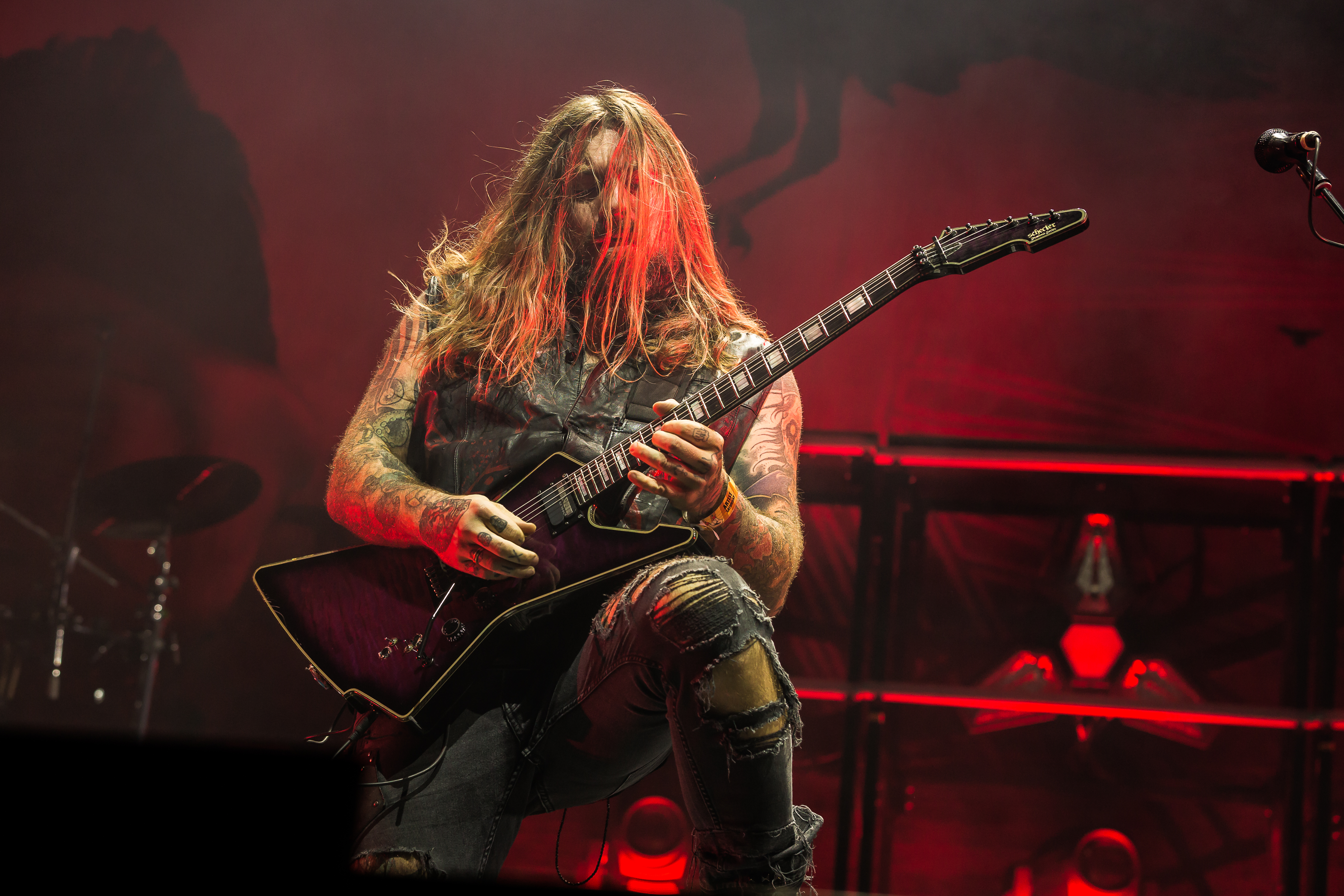
Chris Hermsdörfer

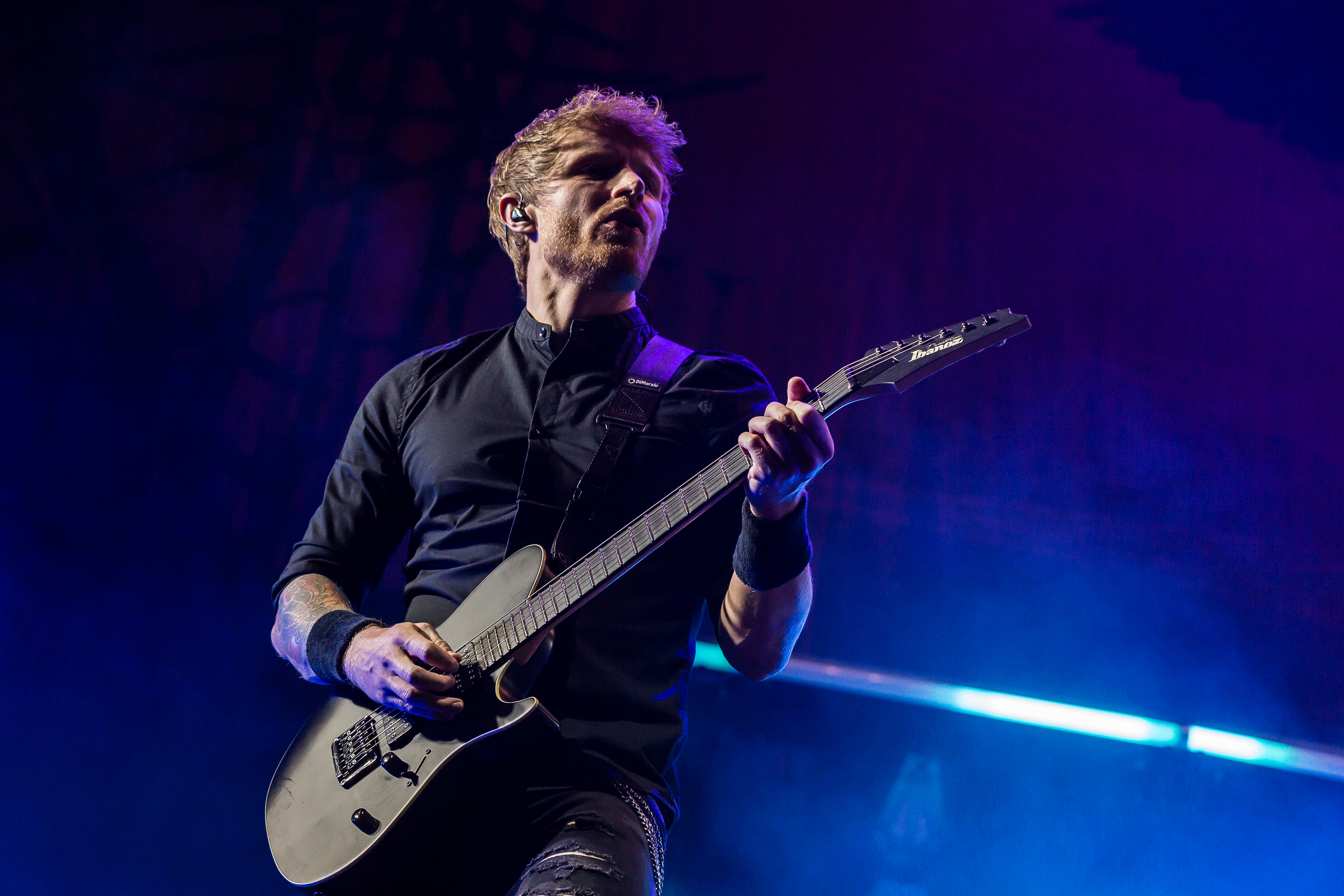
Tobias Lodes

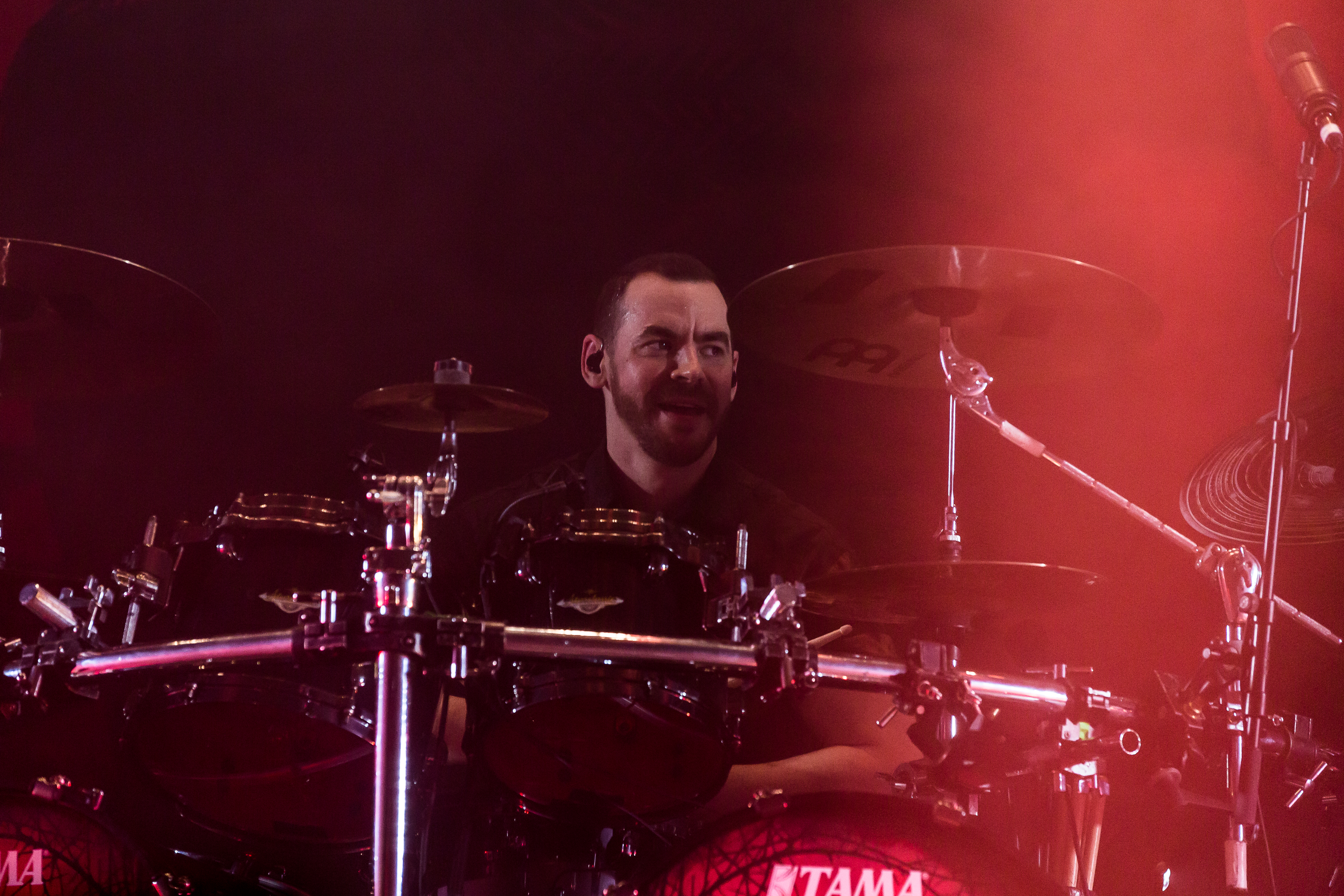
Kai Tschierschky

Current

- Jennifer Haben – lead vocals, piano, acoustic guitar (2014–present)
- Chris Hermsdörfer – lead guitar, backing vocals (2016–present)
- Tobi Lodes – rhythm guitar, backing vocals (2016–present)
- Kai Tschierschky – drums (2016–present)

Live

- Linus Klausenitzer – bass, backing vocals (2021–present)

Former

- Nils Lesser – lead guitar (2014–2016)
- Christopher Hummels – rhythm guitar, backing vocals (2014–2016)
- Tobias Derer – drums (2014–2016)
- Erwin Schmidt – bass (2014–2016)
- Michael Hauser – keyboards (2014–2016)
- Jonas Roßner – keyboards, backing vocals (2016–2018)
- Stefan Herkenhoff – bass, backing vocals (2016–2021)

Timeline

== Discography ==
=== Studio albums ===
Title	Album details	Peak chart positions			
Title	Album details	GER	AUT	BEL	SWI
Songs of Love and Death	Release: 13 February 2015; Label: Airforce1; Formats: CD, digital download	12	21	—	51
Lost in Forever	Release: 12 February 2016; Label: Airforce1 Records; Formats: CD, digital download	4	21	—	28
Heart of the Hurricane	Release: 31 August 2018; Label: Napalm Records; Formats: CD, digital download, vinyl	5	28	—	14
Hørizøns	Released: 19 June 2020; Label: Napalm Records; Formats: CD, digital download, vinyl	3	16	53	6
Beyond the Black	Released: 13 January 2023; Label: Nuclear Blast; Formats: CD, digital download, vinyl	2	14	101	6
Break the Silence	Released: 9 January 2026; Label: Nuclear Blast; Formats: CD, digital download, vinyl	2	4	125	8

=== EPs ===
Year	Title
2020	W:O:A Acoustic Clash: The Lockdown Session
