= Mia Münster =

German artist (1894–1970)

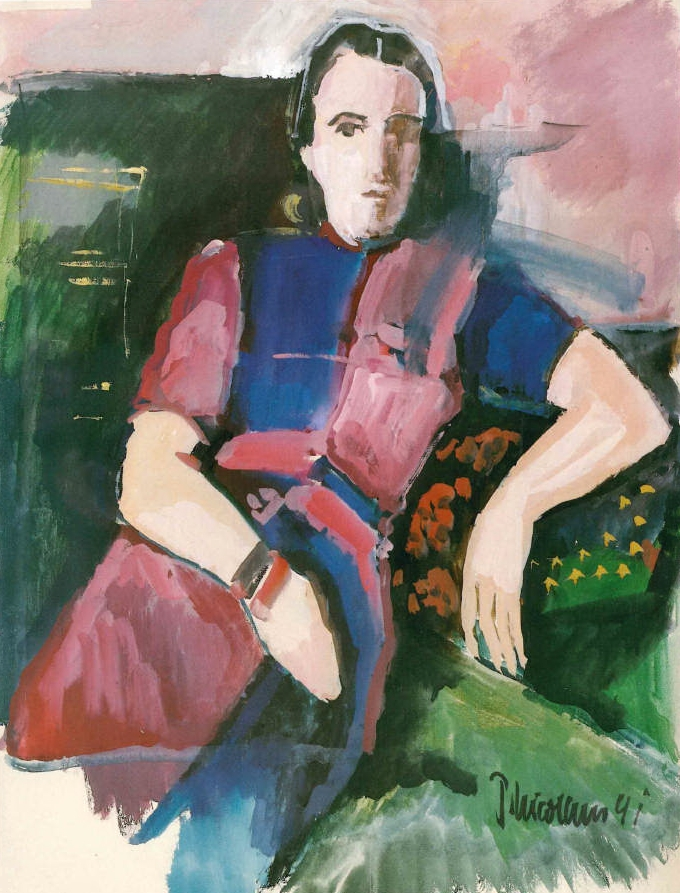
Portrait by Paul Nicolaus, 1941

Mia Münster (April 1, 1894 – May 21, 1970) was a German artist.

== Life ==
Münster was born and grew up in Sankt Wendel in Saarland, Germany. In 1912 she moved to Düsseldorf and enrolled in an art school. She took lessons from the artists Otto Weil and Richard Wenzel until 1919, when she moved to Halle and studied until 1920 at the Leipzig Academy of Visual Arts. After that she studied until 1922 at the School of Applied Arts in Munich (now part of the Academy of Fine Arts). During this period she worked for various magazines as well as for the "Moewe-Filmverlag", a cartoon studio.

In 1924 Münster obtained a teaching position at the newly founded State School of Arts and Crafts (Staatliche Schule für Kunst und Kunstgewerbe), now "Saar College of Visual Arts" in Saarbrücken. Over the following two years she studied at the Reimann School in Berlin, a private academy for decoration and commercial art. She returned to Sankt Wendel from 1926 to 1928, and then back to Berlin until 1932. Subsequently, she returned home to Sankt Wendel again where she finally settled and worked as a free-lance artist. From 1940 on she traveled widely in Lorraine, Italy, Spain and in various regions of France, from which she acquired influences for her painting. Mia Münster died at age 76 in 1970 in Sankt Wendel.

== Work ==
Münster belonged to the generation of artists popularly termed the Lost Generation, born roughly between 1890 and 1910. These artists received little or no respect in the art world in the period after World War II because abstract art was fashionable and older artists, who still worked in figurative style, were mostly ignored.

During her time in Berlin and Munich Münster made her living producing commercial art. She drew fashion illustrations and prepared designs and drawings for German entertainment magazines and satirical publications. In addition she produced illustrations for extravagant costumes and clothing for the special occasions which were popular in the "Golden Twenties". Münster captured the spirit of the times, marked initially by exuberance and later by insecurity and impoverishment, in many drawings, watercolors, and sketches.

After she had finally settled in Sankt Wendel she devoted herself to other themes. Her cycle of paintings Lorraine Images (Lothringer Bilder), created after a trip to the nearby Lorraine region of France, is ranked among her best work. A break in her artistic work followed; her earlier figurative work was followed by non-representational abstraction whose stylistic elements, especially Cubism, which she adopted under the influence of contemporary tastes.

After this phase, roughly around the beginning of the 1960s, she came in contact with the technique that was new to her, called the Monotype. Here she developed a unique, refined style, continuing with Abstractionism.

== Honors and acknowledgements ==
- The Mia Münster House in Sankt Wendel, opened in 1989, was named after her. It houses the city library and the Sankt Wendel Museum with a permanent exhibition of her work.
- To honor Münster, the city created the Mia Münster Prize to recognize outstanding artists from around the region.

== Individual exhibitions ==
- 1964 St. Wendel
- 1969 Old City Hall, St. Wendel
- 1970 Elitzer Gallery, Saarbrücken
- 1977 Galerie im Zwinger, St. Wendel: Mia Münster retrospective
- 1980 Galerie Bosener Mühle, Bosen: Mia Münster retrospective
- 1984 Galerie im Hof, St. Wendel: Mia Münster 90th birthday celebration
- 1994 Mia Münster House, St. Wendel: Mia Münster 100th birthday celebration
- 1995 Mia Münster House, St. Wendel
- 2000 Salzbrunnenhaus, Sulzbach
- 2002 Mia Münster House, St. Wendel: Fashion Design in the 1920s
- 2010 Mia Münster House, St. Wendel: 180 works from her estate

== Works in public spaces (selection) ==
- 1953 School for Learning Disabled (Baltersweiler): wall painting
- 1953-54 Rastpfuhl Elementary and day school (Saarbrücken): sgraffito
- 1955 Primary school (St. Wendel Bliesen): Mural
- 1956 School of Home Economics (Freisen): Mural
- 1957 Primary school (St. Wendel-Oberlinxweiler): Mural
- 1958 Dr. Josef Bruch School (St. Wendel): column and wall decoration
- 1960 Primary school (Grügelborn): Mural
- 1960 Primary school (Schwarzenacker): Mural
- 1961 Primary school (Bosen): mosaic wall
- 1962 Nicholas Obertreis School (St. Wendel): mosaic wall decoration
- 1962 Nicholas Obertreis School (St. Wendel): Stained glass window
- 1963 primary school (Roschberg): Wall decoration
- 1964 Wingert School (St. Wendel): Wall painting,
- 1964 Primary and secondary school (Eiweiler): Wall decoration
- 1964 County Commissioner's Office, large meeting room (St. Wendel): Wall decoration
- 1966 Primary School (Oberkirchen): Wall mosaic and stained glass window
- 1966 Primary school (Furschweiler): glass mosaics
- 1968-69 Administration Building of Globus Handleshof (St. Wendel): Wall painting
