= Jennifer Haben =

German singer (born 1995)

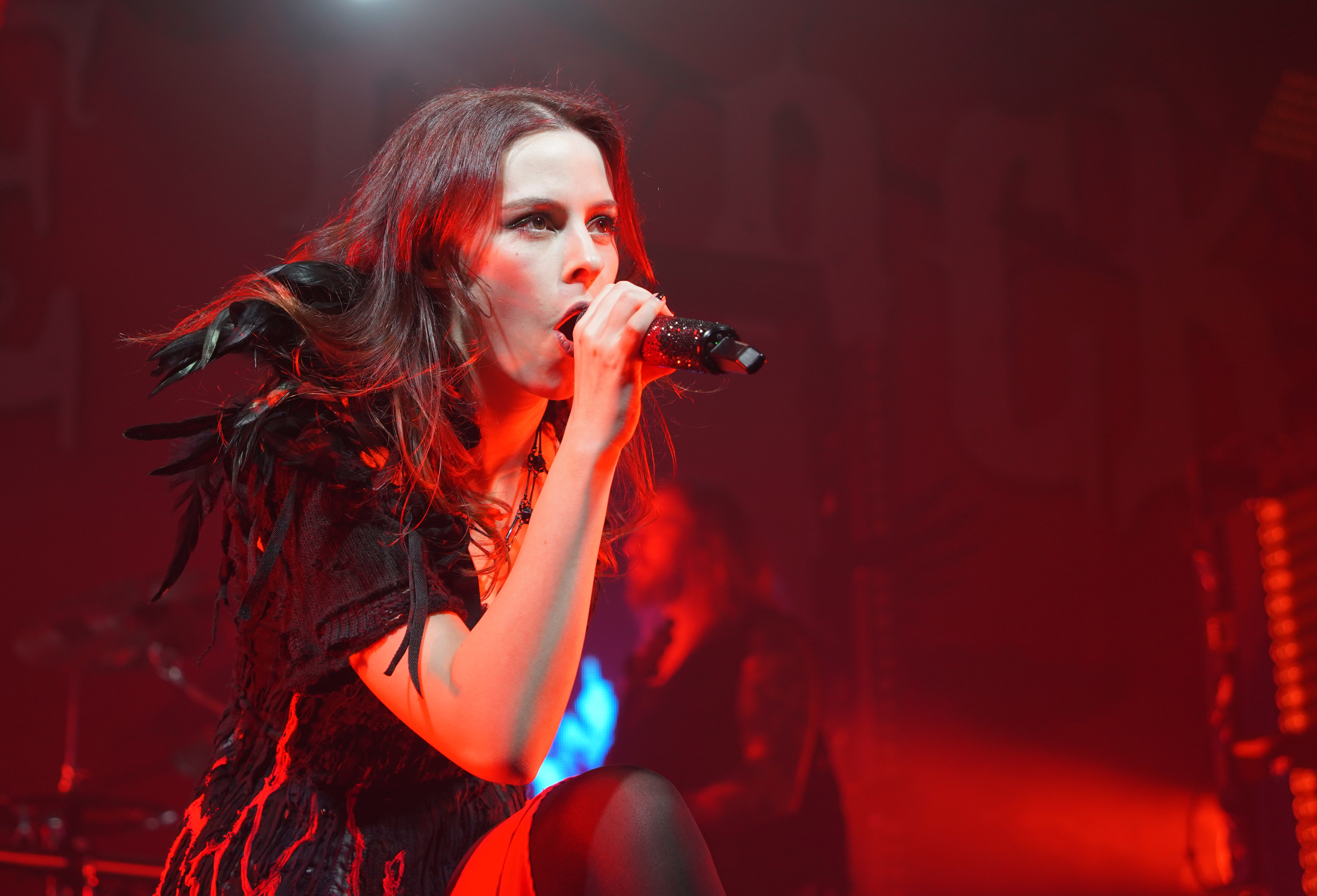
- Haben in 2024

Background information
- Born: 16 July 1995 (age 31); Sankt Wendel, Saarland, Germany
- Genres: Pop; symphonic metal
- Occupation: Singer
- Instrument: Vocals
- Years active: 2005–present
- Member of: Beyond the Black
- Formerly of: Saphir

Jennifer Haben (born 16 July 1995) is a German singer. She is the lead vocalist and founder of the symphonic metal band Beyond the Black. She was also a vocalist of the German pop group Saphir.

== Biography ==
=== Early life and career ===
Haben took piano lessons from the age of six, and three years later, saxophone lessons. She learned the first guitar chords from her mother at the age of six and taught herself the first songs. In the fourth school year, Haben founded the school band "Speed", the "youngest band in Saarland" with her brother. In 2005, her father sent a trial video for the tenth anniversary of the RTL telethon to RTL, whereupon she with Alexander Klaws performed on the song Ich will was tun für dich. In 2006 she played saxophone and sang a solo at the Heavytones Kids on the TV Total TV. In 2007 she won the KiKA competition Beste Stimme 2007, performing I Will Always Love You by Whitney Houston, with 73.5 percent of the vote. In the same year, she sang the title melody of the KiKA show “Space for Heroes” and played live appearances at the KiKA summer tour in 2007. With her band Speed, she won a youth band festival in Sankt Wendel and thus a guitar amplifier and a day in the loop-music recording studio. In 2009, she won the Hannah Montana vocal competition, initiated by Disney Channel and Super RTL, the single published the best for you (album: Disney Star Clique) and sang in the Disney Channel trailer Mehr Sommer für alle (Summer of Stars).

In 2010, Haben became a member of the pop group Saphir, which consisted of the KiKA "Best Voice" winners from 2007 to 2010. The band released a single and an album in 2010 and performed nationwide. After these successes, she received a high school diploma in St. Wendel and began studying music management in Saarbrücken.

=== Beyond the Black ===
In 2014, Haben founded the symphonic metal band Beyond the Black, who were invited to Wacken Open Air in the same year and has been there since then. So far, the group has four studio albums that pour into the top 10 of the German album charts.

In 2019, Haben took part in the sixth season of the TV show Sing meinen Song – Das Tauschkonzert. On 24 June 2022, she moderated the Festival Download Germany at the Hockenheimring for Magenta Music.

== Discography ==
With Beyond the Black
