= Beyond the Black (album) =

Studio album by Beyond the Black
- Released: 13 January 2023
- Genre: Symphonic metal
- Length: 42:00
- Label: Nuclear Blast
- Producer: Marc Schettler; Sascha Paeth; Niklas Budinsky; Mark Nissen; Hardy Krech

Beyond the Black chronology
Hørizøns (2020)	Beyond the Black (2023)	Break the Silence (2026)

Singles from Beyond the Black
- 1. "Reincarnation" Released: 17 June 2022; 2. "Winter Is Coming" Released: 6 October 2022; 3. "Dancing in the Dark" Released: 2 December 2022

Beyond the Black is the fifth studio album by the German symphonic metal band Beyond the Black. It was released on 13 January 2023 through Nuclear Blast.

== Background and promotion ==
On 17 August 2021, Beyond the Black signed with the label Nuclear Blast. On 17 June 2022, the band released the album's first single "Reincarnation". On 6 October, the band released the second single "Winter Is Coming" while also announcing their fifth studio album would be self-titled. On 2 December, Beyond the Black released the third single for "Dancing in the Dark".

== Track listing ==
No.	Title	Length
1.	"Is There Anybody Out There?"	4:29
2.	"Reincarnation"	4:13
3.	"Free Me"	4:01
4.	"Winter Is Coming"	4:37
5.	"Into the Light"	4:12
6.	"Wide Awake"	4:10
7.	"Dancing in the Dark"	4:05
8.	"Raise Your Head"	4:18
9.	"Not in Our Name"	3:41
10.	"I Remember Dying"	4:15
Total length:		42:00

== Personnel ==
Beyond the Black

- Jennifer Haben – lead vocals
- Tobi Lodes – guitar, backing vocals
- Chris Hermsdörfer – guitar, backing vocals
- Kai Tschierschky – drums

Additional personnel

- Amanda Somerville – backing vocals
- Billy King – backing vocals
- Sandro Friedrich – flute, pipes

Production

- Heilemania – artwork, photography
- Marc Schettler – mastering, producer
- Sascha Paeth – producer
- Niklas Budinsky – producer
- Mark Nissen – producer
- Hardy Krech – producer

== Charts ==
Chart (2023)	Peak position
Belgian Albums (Ultratop Flanders)	101
Austrian Albums (Ö3 Austria)	14
German Albums (Offizielle Top 100)	2
Scottish Albums (OCC)	29
Swiss Albums (Schweizer Hitparade)	6
UK Independent Albums (OCC)	7
UK Rock & Metal Albums (OCC)	2
