= Wendelin of Trier =

German saint

Saint Wendelin of Trier
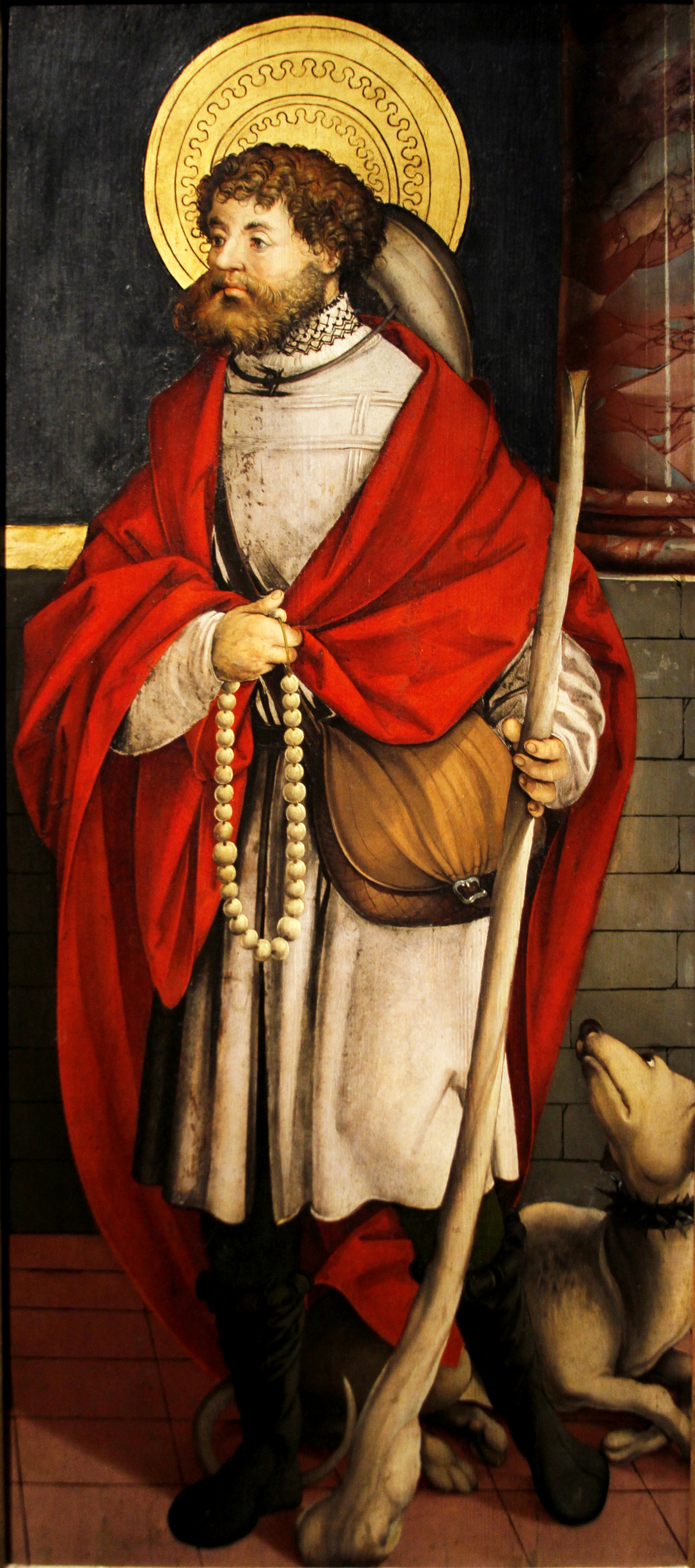
- Picture of St Wendelin in Staatsgalerie Stuttgart art museum
- Born: c. 554; Scotland
- Died: c. 617; Sankt Wendel, Saarland, Germany
- Venerated in: Catholic Church; Eastern Orthodox Church
- Canonized: Pre-Congregation
- Feast: 22 October
- Patronage: country folk, herdsmen

Saint Wendelin of Trier (Latin: Vendelinus; c. 554 - c. 617 AD) was a hermit and abbot. His cultus is wide-spread in German-speaking areas. He is a patron of country folk and herdsmen. He is honored on October 22.

== Life ==
Because no information about him was available, a biography was written in the Middle Ages, which is based purely on legendary data and tells not so much the life of Saint Wendelinus, but rather how the medieval man of that time imagined the life of a holy hermit from earlier times. There is very little definite information about this saint; his earliest biographies (two in Latin and two in German), did not appear until after 1417. The name "Wendelin" means "wanderer" or "pilgrim" in Old High German. The biographies state that Wendelin was the son of a Scottish king who led a pious life as a youth before leaving his home in secret to make a pilgrimage to Rome. On his way back he settled as a hermit at Westrich in the Diocese of Trier.

One day when he went to Treves to perform his devotions, and begged his bread from house to house, a nobleman who saw him, and reproved him with great vehemence, saying that begging was the result of laziness and a disorderly life. Wendelin entered his service as a herdsman, but a miracle led the landowner to allow him to return to his solitude.

Wendelin then established a company of hermits from which sprang the Benedictine Abbey of Tholey in Saarland. It is not clear whether Tholey arose from his hermitage, or whether he left his hermitage to become abbot in Tholey. He was consecrated abbot in approximately 597, according to the later legends, while Tholey was apparently founded as a collegiate body about 630. It is difficult to say how far the later biographers are trustworthy.

== Legend ==
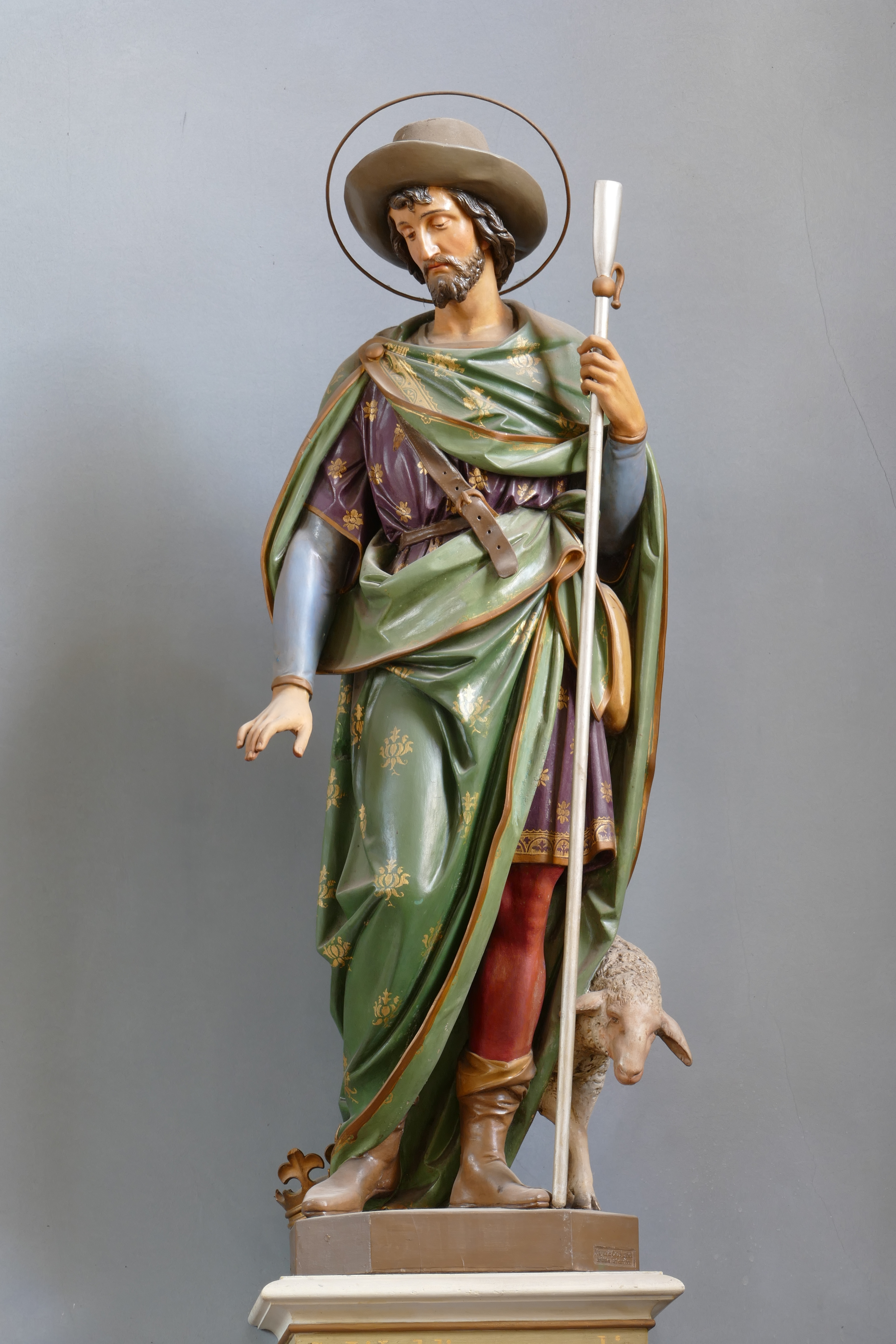
Saint-Wendelin, Église Saint-Gall, Niedermorschwihr StGall

The story is told that when Wendelin was working as a herdsman he often took his flock to a mountain to pray there in silence. The sheep thrived under his care, and jealous servants reported that he drove the sheep to a field so far distant that they were exhausted when they returned to the fold. The master coming upon him there, was angry because he could not imagine that Wendelin had time to get the flock home before sunset. However, when the master arrived home on horseback he discovered the shepherd and his flock already there. Realizing that this was a miracle from God he granted Wendelin his greatest desire and built him his own hermit cell in the vicinity of the farm.

== Death and veneration ==
Wendelin was buried in his cell, and a chapel was built over the grave and the small town of Sankt Wendel grew up nearby. The saint's intercession was considered powerful in times of pestilence and contagious diseases among cattle. When in 1320 a pestilence was checked through the intercession of the saint, Baldwin, Archbishop of Trier had the chapel rebuilt. Baldwin's successor, Bohemond II, built the present beautiful Gothic church, dedicated in 1360, to which the saint's relics were transferred. Since 1506 they have rested in a stone sarcophagus. People make a pilgrimage to Wendalinus basilica on St. Wendelin's day in October.

Wendelin is the patron saint of country people and herdsmen and is still venerated in Germany, Austria, Switzerland and South Africa. Saint Wendelin's feast is observed in the Diocese of Trier on 22 October, but in the Roman Martyrology on 21 October.

St Wendelin is also celebrated in Hungary. Two statues celebrating Saint Wendelin and Saint Florian are in a small square in Zalavar village. They sit on separate similar plinths next to each other. (This arrangement and the style of the statues appears to be in the period 1900-1930). The statues are not outside the village churches. Many villages in west Hungary have two Christian churches, one Catholic and the other Protestant.) Before 1920, German was the dominant language in hundreds of villages in Hungary, although Zalavar appears to not be in the main German speaking areas. A Zalavar monument listing people who died in both World Wars has two or three names of German origin. Zalavar cemetery has very few graves displaying names of German origin. At the oldest section of the cemetery furthest from the road most graves have no headstone.

Sacred Heart Church in Perkinsville, New York holds a relic of Wendelin. In 2017, a German film crew visited the hamlet while making a documentary about the saint.

== Iconography ==
He is represented in art as either a youth or a bearded man, with a shepherd's bag and a book in one hand and a shepherd's crook in the other. He is often pictured with feeding lambs, cattle, and swine, while a crown and a shield appear at his feet.

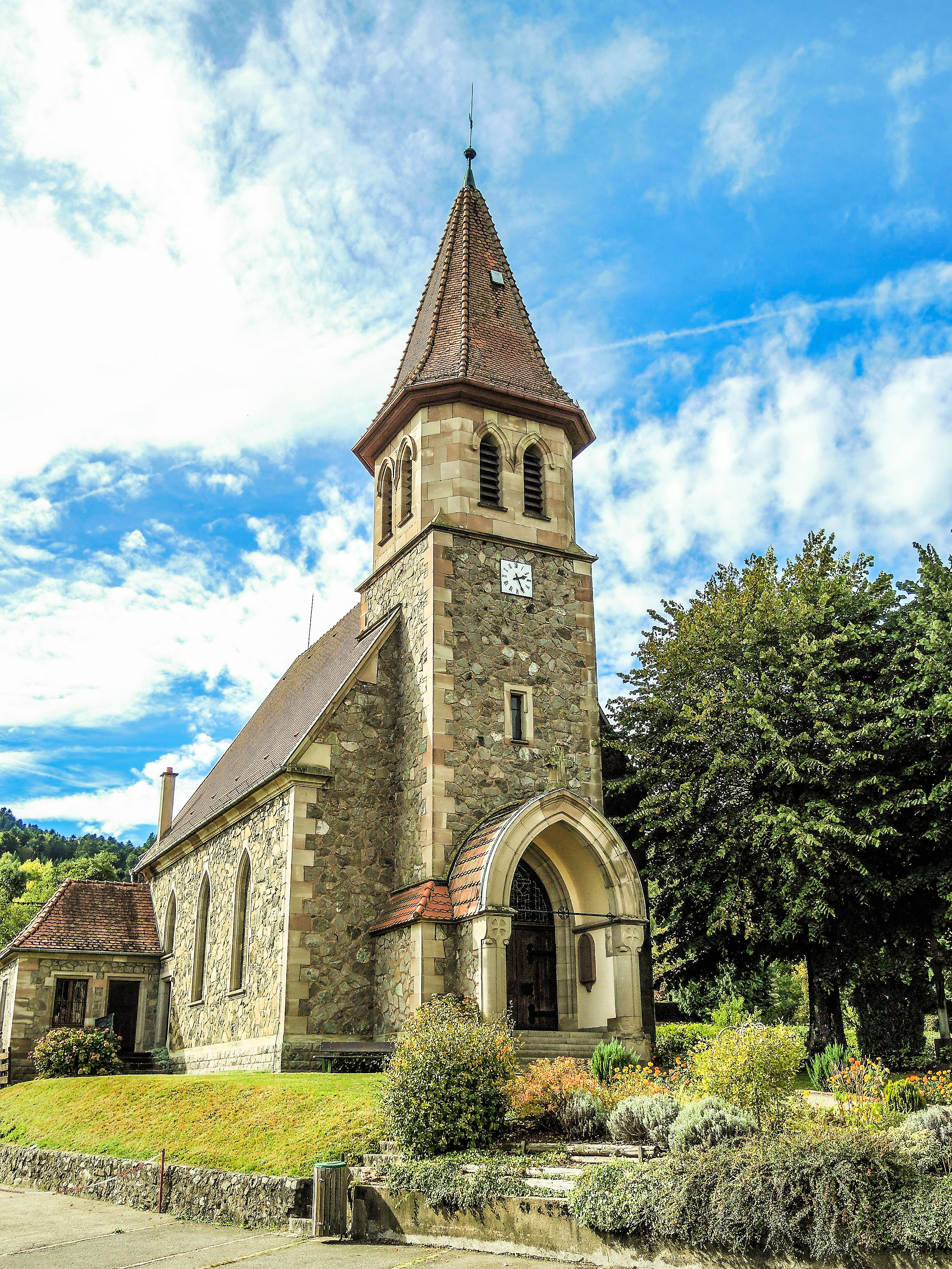
Chapelle saint Wendelin, Niederbrück. Haut-Rhin

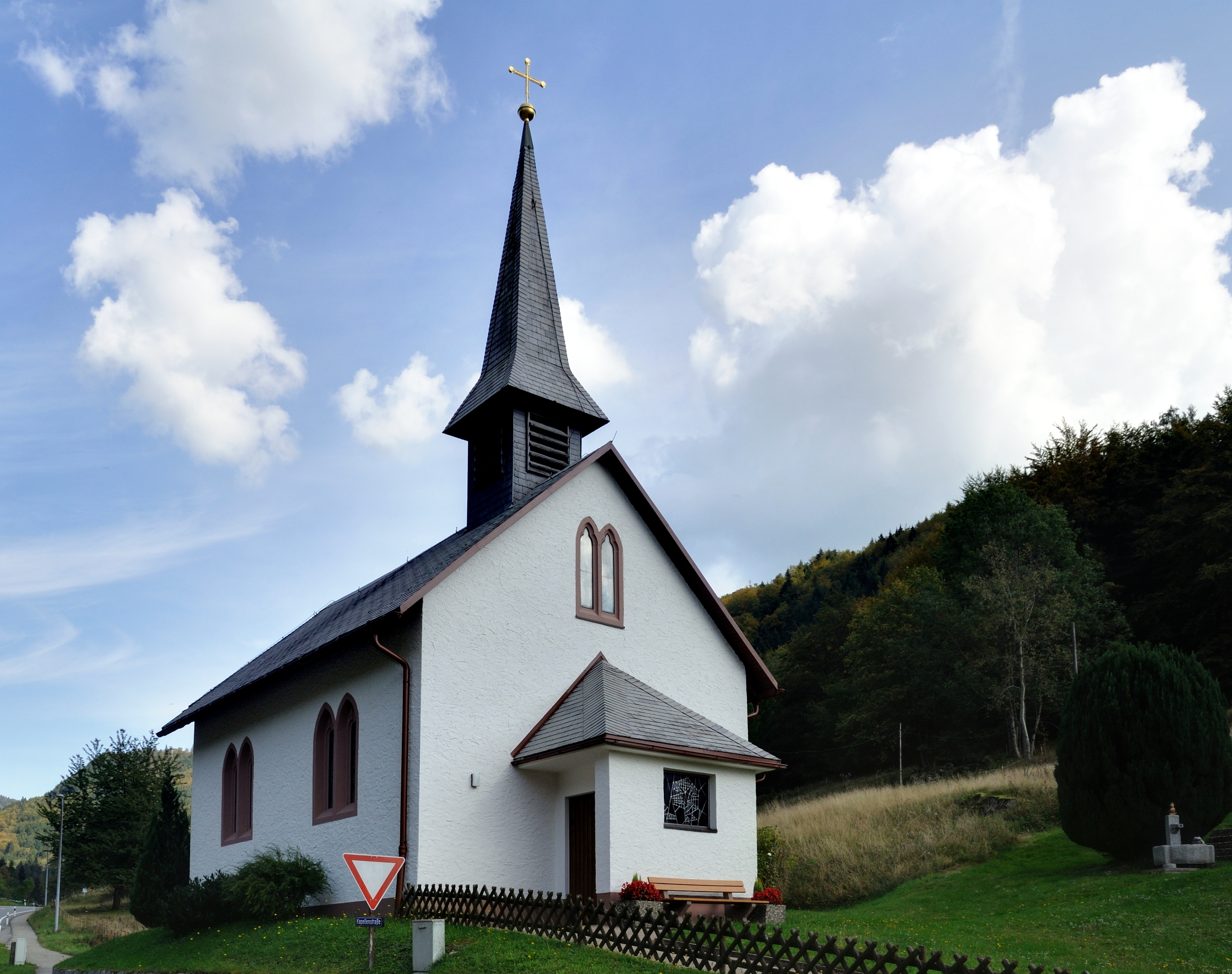
St. Wendelin, Brandenberg

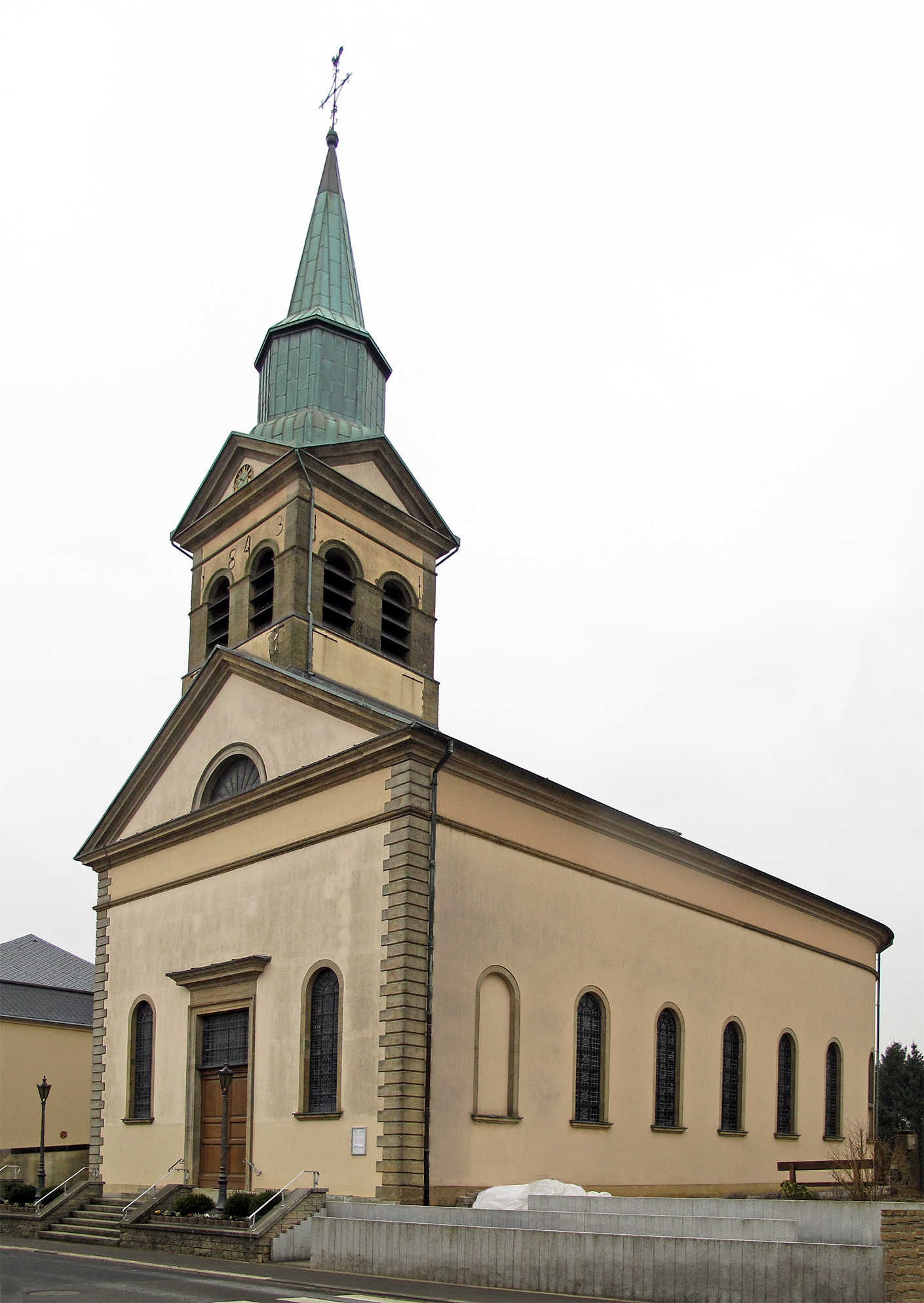
Église Saint-Wendelin, Keispelt

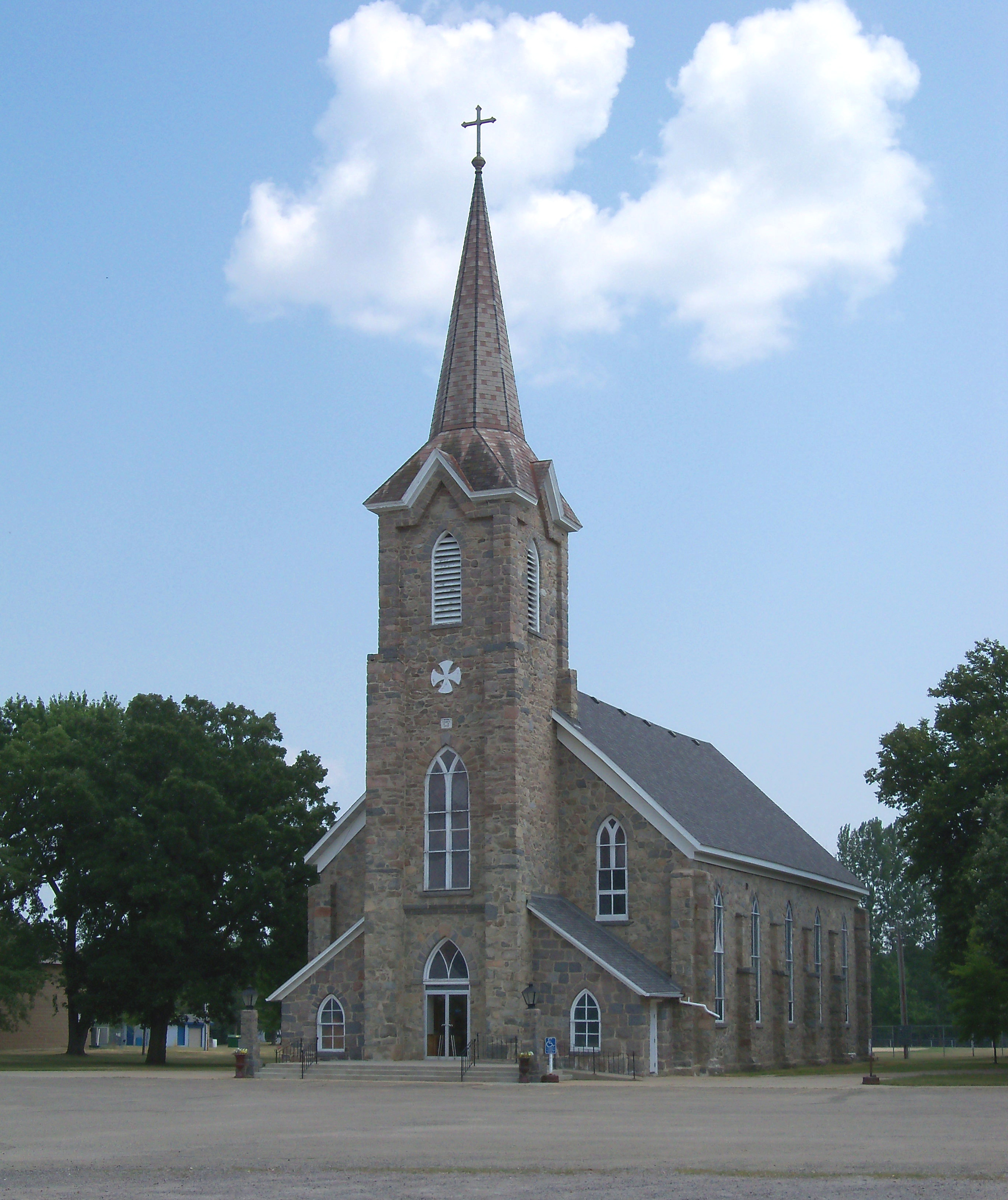
St. Wendelin's, Luxemburg, Minnesota
