= Sebastian Schorr =

German politician (born 1989)

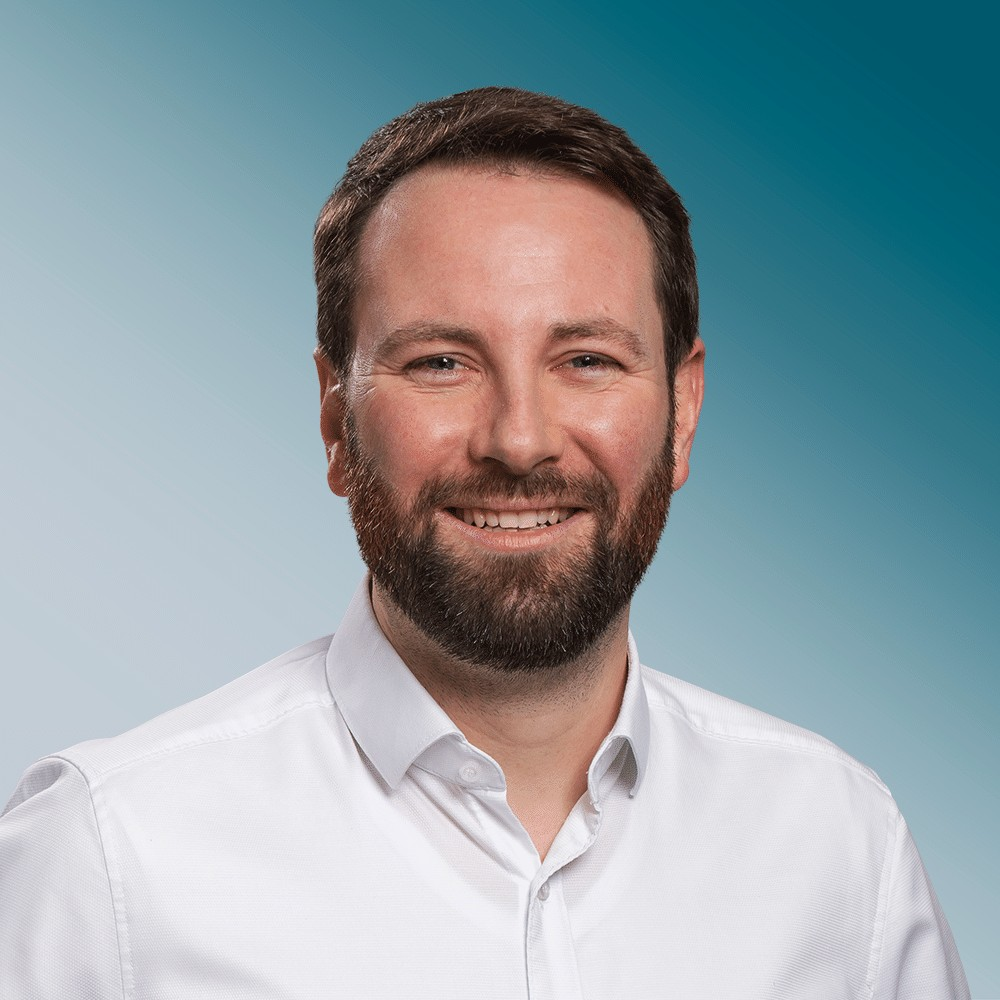
- Schorr in 2026

Member of the Landtag of Saarland
- Incumbent
- Assumed office 9 April 2025
- Preceded by: Roland Theis

Personal details
- Born: 23 November 1989 (age 36) Sankt Wendel
- Party: Christian Democratic Union (since 2011)

Sebastian Schorr (born 23 November 1989 in Sankt Wendel) is a German politician serving as a member of the Landtag of Saarland since 2025. He is the group leader of the Christian Democratic Union in the city council of Sankt Wendel.
