= Break the Silence (Beyond the Black album) =

Studio album by Beyond the Black
- Released: 9 January 2026
- Genre: Power metal, symphonic metal
- Length: 37:29
- Label: Nuclear Blast
- Producer: Mark Nissen; Hardy Krech

Beyond the Black chronology
| Beyond the Black (2023) | Break the Silence (2026) |

Singles from Break the Silence
- 1. "Rising High" Released: 21 June 2025; 2. "Break the Silence" Released: 29 July 2025; 3. "The Art of Being Alone" Released: 17 September 2025; 4. "Can You Hear Me" Released: 25 October 2025; 5. "Ravens" Released: 7 December 2025; 6. "Let There Be Rain" Released: 9 January 2026

Professional ratings
Review scores
| Source | Rating |
|---|---|
| Blabbermouth.net | 8.5/10 |
| Chaoszine | 4.5/5 stars |
| Dead Rhetoric | 9.5/10 |
| Distorted Sound | 7/10 |

Break the Silence is the sixth studio album by German symphonic metal band Beyond the Black. It was released on 9 January 2026 through Nuclear Blast.

== Background and promotion ==
On 10 December 2024, Beyond the Black announced that they will embark on a European tour in January and February 2026, entitled the Rising High Tour. On 21 June 2025, the band released the album's first single "Rising High", which shares the same name as the tour. On 29 July, the band released the album's title track as its second single alongside the album's announcement. Two months later, on 17 September, Beyond the Black released the album's third single for "The Art of Being Alone", featuring Lord of the Lost vocalist Chris Harms. On 25 October, the band released the fourth single "Can You Hear Me", which features Lovebites vocalist Asami and has spawned an animated music video. On 7 December, Beyond the Black released the album's fifth single for "Ravens". Finally, the album's sixth single "Let There Be Rain" was released on 9 January 2026, the day the album was released, featuring The Mystery of the Bulgarian Voices vocalist Gergana Dimitrova.

== Track listing ==
| No. | Title | Length |
|---|---|---|
| 1. | "Rising High" | 3:12 |
| 2. | "Break the Silence" | 4:23 |
| 3. | "The Art of Being Alone" | 4:19 |
| 4. | "Let There Be Rain" | 3:46 |
| 5. | "Ravens" | 3:43 |
| 6. | "The Flood" | 3:52 |
| 7. | "Can You Hear Me" | 4:05 |
| 8. | "(La vie est un) Cinéma" | 3:18 |
| 9. | "Hologram" | 3:18 |
| 10. | "Weltschmerz" | 3:33 |
| Total length: | | 37:29 |

== Personnel ==
Beyond the Black

- Jennifer Haben – lead vocals
- Tobi Lodes – guitar, backing vocals
- Chris Hermsdörfer – guitar, backing vocals
- Kai Tschierschky – drums

Additional personnel

- Chris Harms – vocals on track 3
- Gergana Dimitrova – vocals on track 4
- Asami – vocals on track 7

Production

- Stefan Heilemann – artwork, photography
- Mark Nissen – producer, mixing, mastering
- Hardy Krech – producer, mixing, mastering

== Charts ==
Chart performance for Break the Silence
| Chart (2026) | Peak position |
|---|---|
| Austrian Albums (Ö3 Austria) | 4 |
| Belgian Albums (Ultratop Flanders) | 125 |
| Belgian Albums (Ultratop Wallonia) | 49 |
| French Physical Albums (SNEP) | 45 |
| French Rock & Metal Albums (SNEP) | 10 |
| German Albums (Offizielle Top 100) | 2 |
| German Rock & Metal Albums (Offizielle Top 100) | 2 |
| Japanese Rock Albums (Oricon) | 18 |
| Japanese Top Albums Sales (Billboard Japan) | 92 |
| Japanese Western Albums (Oricon) | 21 |
| Scottish Albums (OCC) | 38 |
| Swedish Physical Albums (Sverigetopplistan) | 10 |
| Swiss Albums (Schweizer Hitparade) | 8 |
| UK Albums Sales (OCC) | 15 |
| UK Independent Albums (OCC) | 8 |
| UK Rock & Metal Albums (OCC) | 2 |
