= Heart of the Hurricane =

Studio album by Beyond the Black
- Released: 31 August 2018
- Studios: Gate Studio, Wolfsburg, Germany
- Genre: Symphonic metal
- Length: 55:29
- Label: Napalm Records
- Producers: Hartmut Krech, Mark Nissen, Hannes Braun, Sascha Paeth

Beyond the Black chronology
Lost in Forever (2016)	Heart of the Hurricane (2018)	Hørizøns (2020)

Professional ratings
Review scores
Source	Rating
Distorted Sound	8/10
Sonic Perspectives	8/10

Heart of the Hurricane is the third studio album by the German symphonic metal band Beyond the Black. It was released on 31 August 2018 through Napalm Records. This is the first album to feature an all-new lineup assembled by vocalist Jennifer Haben; drummer Kai Tschierschky, guitarists Tobi Lodes and Chris Hermsdörfer, and bassist Stefan Herkenhoff. Hermsdörfer contributed male singing in "Million Lightyears" and growled vocals in "My God Is Dead" and "Scream for Me".

== Track listing ==
No.	Title	Length
1.	"Hysteria"	4:37
2.	"Heart of the Hurricane"	4:09
3.	"Through the Mirror"	3:34
4.	"Million Lightyears"	4:42
5.	"Song for the Godless"	5:15
6.	"Escape from the Earth"	3:08
7.	"Beneath a Blackened Sky"	5:02
8.	"Fairytale of Doom"	4:43
9.	"My God Is Dead"	5:01
10.	"Dear Death"	4:09
11.	"Scream for Me"	4:04
12.	"Freedom"	3:44
13.	"Breeze"	3:51
Total length:		55:29

Bonus tracks
No.	Title	Length
14.	"Echo from the Past"	5:31
15.	"Parade"	3:41
Total length:		64:41

Black Edition
No.	Title	Length
16.	"Spiderweb Of Eyes"	3:49
17.	"We Will Find A Way"	4:26
18.	"Still Breathing"	4:10
Total length:		76:36

Vinyl exclusive
No.	Title	Length
19.	"Wound so Deep"	3:39
Total length:		80:15

== Personnel ==
Beyond the Black

- Jennifer Haben – lead vocals
- Tobi Lodes – guitar, backing vocals
- Chris Hermsdörfer – guitar, backing vocals, co-lead vocals on tracks 4, 9, and 11
- Stefan Herkenhoff – bass
- Kai Tschierschky – drums

Session musicians

- Corvin Bahn – keyboards
- Sandro Friedrich – flute
- Billy King – choir vocals
- Kammerchor Vela Cantamus – choir vocals on "Breeze"

Production

- Hartmut Krech, Mark Nissen, Hannes Braun – producers, engineers and mixing on tracks 1, 3, 4, 8, 9, 11, and 14
- Sascha Paeth – producer, engineer and mixing on tracks 2, 5, 6, 7, 10, 12, 13, and 15
- Heilemania – artwork, photography
- Michael 'Miro' Rodenberg – mastering, additional programming

== Charts ==
Chart (2018)	Peak position
Austrian Albums (Ö3 Austria)	5
German Albums (Offizielle Top 100)	4
Swiss Albums (Schweizer Hitparade)	14
UK Independent Albums (Official Charts)	28
UK Rock & Metal Albums (Official Charts)	7
