= Hørizøns =

Studio album by Beyond the Black
- Released: 19 June 2020
- Studio: Principal Studios; Sawdust Recordings
- Genre: Power metal, symphonic metal
- Length: 55:40
- Label: Napalm Records
- Producer: Marc Schettler; Jim Müller; Vincent Sorg; Christoph Wieczorek; Mark Nissen; Hardy Krech

Beyond the Black chronology
Heart of the Hurricane (2018)	Hørizøns (2020)	Beyond the Black (2023)

Singles from Hørizøns
- 1. "Misery" Released: 6 March 2020; 2. "Golden Pariahs" Released: 3 April 2020; 3. "Human" Released: 19 June 2020

Professional ratings
Review scores
Source	Rating
Distorted Sound	8/10
Metal Hammer	3/5 stars

Hørizøns is the fourth studio album by the German symphonic metal band Beyond the Black. It was released on 19 June 2020 through Napalm Records. The album is noted to distance from the band's more symphonic roots in favor of "a more modern direction".

On 6 March 2020, the band released the album's first single "Misery". The following month, on 3 April, Beyond the Black released the second single for "Golden Pariahs" while also announcing their fourth studio album to be released on 19 June. On 2 December, Beyond the Black released the third single for "Human".

== Track listing ==
No.	Title	Lyrics	Music	Length
1.	"Horizons"	Jennifer Haben, Hardy Krech, Mark Nissen, David Levy	Haben, Chris Hermsdörfer, Krech, Nissen, Levy	5:00
2.	"Misery"	Haben, Kai Tschierschky, Vincent Sorg, Lukas Hainer	Haben, Hermsdörfer, Sorg	3:44
3.	"Wounded Healer" (featuring Elize Ryd)	Haben, Krech, Nissen, Levy	Haben, Hermsdörfer, Krech, Nissen, Levy, Stefan Herkenhoff	4:13
4.	"Some Kind of Monster"	Haben, Krech, Nissen, Hainer	Haben, Hermsdörfer, Krech, Nissen, Johannes Braun	4:21
5.	"Human"	Haben, Krech, Nissen, Hainer	Haben, Hermsdörfer, Krech, Nissen	5:09
6.	"Golden Pariahs"	Haben, Krech, Nissen, Hainer, Julian Bruecker	Haben, Krech, Nissen, Christoph Wieczorek, Bruecker	3:37
7.	"Marching On"	Haben, Krech, Nissen, Hainer, Braun	Haben, Hermsdörfer, Krech, Nissen, Braun	4:01
8.	"You're Not Alone"	Haben, Krech, Nissen, Hainer	Haben, Krech, Nissen, Herkenhoff	4:37
9.	"Out of the Ashes"	Haben, Krech, Nissen, Christian Neander, Daniel Flamm	Haben, Hermsdörfer, Krech, Nissen, Neander, Flamm	4:35
10.	"Paralyzed"	Haben, Hermsdörfer, Tschierschky, Sorg, Herkenhoff	Haben, Hermsdörfer, Sorg, Herkenhoff	3:56
11.	"Coming Home"	Haben, Krech, Nissen, Andreas Schnitzer	Haben, Hermsdörfer, Krech, Nissen	4:42
12.	"I Won't Surrender" (featuring Tina Guo)	Haben, Martin Fliegenschmidt	Haben, Fliegenschmidt	3:56
13.	"Welcome to My Wasteland"	Haben, Krech, Nissen, Hainer	Krech, Nissen	3:49
Total length:				55:40

== Personnel ==
Beyond the Black

- Jennifer Haben – lead vocals
- Tobi Lodes – guitar, backing vocals
- Chris Hermsdörfer – guitar, co-lead vocals
- Stefan Herkenhoff – bass
- Kai Tschierschky – drums

Additional personnel

- Elize Ryd – vocals (on track 3)
- Tina Guo – cello (on track 12)
- Amanda Somerville – choir vocals
- Billy King – choir vocals

Production

- Reinsberg – artwork
- Chris Heidrich – photography
- Marc Schettler – producer (on all tracks except 2, 6, and 10), mastering
- Mark Nissen – producer (on all tracks except 2, 6, and 10), additional programming
- Hardy Krech – producer (on all tracks except 2, 6, and 10), additional programming
- Jim Müller – producer (on tracks 3, 4, 7, 8, and 11), additional programming
- Vincent Sorg – producer (on tracks 2 and 10)
- Christoph Wieczorek – producer (on track 6)

== Charts ==
Chart (2020)	Peak position
Belgian Albums (Ultratop Flanders)	53
Austrian Albums (Ö3 Austria)	16
German Albums (Offizielle Top 100)	3
Swiss Albums (Schweizer Hitparade)	6
