= Lost in Forever (album) =

Studio album by Beyond the Black
- Released: 12 February 2016
- Genre: Symphonic metal, power metal
- Length: 61:03
- Label: Airforce1 Records, We Love Music, Universal
- Producer: Hartmut Krech, Mark Nissen, Hannes Braun, Torsten Brötzmann, Sascha Paeth, Ivo Morig

Beyond the Black chronology
Songs of Love and Death (2015)	Lost in Forever (2016)	Heart of the Hurricane (2018)

Singles from Lost in Forever
- 1. "Lost in Forever" Released: 15 January 2016; 2. "Written in Blood" Released: 21 January 2016; 3. "Halo of the Dark" Released: 29 January 2016

Professional ratings
Review scores
Source	Rating
Distorted Sound	8/10
Metal Hammer	3.5/5 stars
Rock Hard	6.5/10

Lost in Forever is the second studio album by the German symphonic metal band Beyond the Black. It was released on 12 February 2016 on Airforce1 Records and We Love Music. This is the first album to feature all six band members instead of studio and guest musicians. The album was rereleased in 2019 by Austrian record label Napalm Records.

== Track listing ==
No.	Title	Lyrics	Music	Length
1.	"Lost in Forever"	Hartmut Krech, Mark Nissen, Lukas Hainer, Hannes Braun	Krech, Nissen, Hainer, Braun	4:48
2.	"Beautiful Lies"	Hainer	Krech, Nissen, Braun, Anna Brunner	4:09
3.	"Written in Blood"	Sascha Paeth	Paeth	4:21
4.	"Against the World" (Kissin' Dynamite cover)	Ande Braun, Andreas Schnitzer, Krech, Jim Müller, H. Braun, Nissen, Steffen Haile	A. Braun, Schnitzer, Krech, Müller, H. Braun, Nissen, Haile	4:06
5.	"Beyond the Mirror"	Krech, Nissen, Hainer, Braun	Nils Lesser	4:15
6.	"Halo of the Dark"	Krech, Nissen, Hainer, Braun	Krech, Nissen, Hainer, Braun	4:22
7.	"Dies Irae"	Krech, Nissen, Hainer, Braun	Krech, Nissen, Hainer, Braun	4:02
8.	"Forget My Name"	Hainer	Krech, Nissen, Braun, Dave Roth	6:05
9.	"Burning in Flames"	Torsten Brötzmann, Ivo Morig, Charlie Mason	Brötzmann, Morig, Mason, Jennifer Haben	4:15
10.	"Nevermore"	Hainer	Krech, Nissen, Braun, Brunner, Haben	4:18
11.	"Shine and Shade"	Paeth	Brötzmann, Paeth	6:14
12.	"Heaven in Hell"	Brötzmann, Morig, Mason	Brötzmann, Morig, Mason, Haben	4:27
13.	"Love's a Burden"	Paeth	Paeth	3:41
Total length:				61:03

2017 Tour Edition Bonus Tracks
No.	Title	Lyrics	Music	Length
14.	"The Other Side"	Paeth, Haben	Paeth, Haben	4:23
15.	"Dim the Spotlight"	Paeth	Paeth	4:25
16.	"Our Little Time"	Paeth, Haben	Paeth, Haben	4:11
17.	"Rage Before the Storm"	Paeth	Paeth	5:35
Total length:				79:37

Bonus Tracks (Live Album)
No.	Title	Length
1.	"In the Shadows (Live At Wacken Open Air 2015)"
2.	"When Angels Fall (Live At Wacken Open Air 2015)"
3.	"Songs of Love And Death (Live At Wacken Open Air 2015)"
4.	"Rage Before the Storm (Live At Wacken Open Air 2015)"
5.	"Love Me Forever (Live At Wacken Open Air 2015)"
6.	"Fall into the Flames (Live At Wacken Open Air 2015)"
7.	"Drowning in Darkness (Live At Wacken Open Air 2015)"
8.	"Hallelujah (Live At Wacken Open Air 2015)"
9.	"Running to the Edge (Live At Wacken Open Air 2015)"
10.	"On the Road with Beyond the Black - Part 1"
11.	"Menu / Beyond the Black / Live"

2017 Germany Tour Edition and 2019 Tour Edition Bonus Tracks
No.	Title	Lyrics	Music	Length
14.	"Night Will Fade"	Krech, Nissen, Hainer, Braun	Krech, Nissen, Hainer, Braun	4:29
15.	"The Other Side"			4:23
16.	"Our Little Time"			4:11
17.	"Rage Before the Storm" (featuring Herbie Langhans)			5:35
Total length:				79:41

== Personnel ==
Beyond the Black

- Jennifer Haben – lead vocals
- Nils Lesser – lead guitar & backing vocals
- Christopher Hummels – rhythm guitar & backing vocals
- Erwin Schmidt – bass
- Tobias Derer – drums
- Michael Hauser – keyboards

Guest musicians

- Rick Altzi (Masterplan) – guest vocals on "Beautiful Lies"
- Herbie Langhans (Beyond the Bridge, Sinbreed, Firewind) – guest vocals on "Rage Before the Storm"

Production

- Hartmut Krech, Mark Nissen, Hannes Braun – producers, engineers and mixing on tracks 1, 2, 4, 6, 7 and 8
- Sascha Paeth – producer on tracks 3, 5, 10, 11, 13 to 17, engineer and mixing on tracks 3, 5, 9 to 17
- Thorsten Brötzmann – producer on tracks 9 to 12
- Ivo Morig – producer on tracks 9 and 12
- Sascha Bühren – mastering of tracks 1–13 at TrueBusiness Studios, Berlin, Germany
- Michael 'Miro' Rodenberg – mastering of tracks 14–17 at GateStudio, Wolfsburg, Germany

== Charts ==
Chart (2016)	Peak position
Austrian Albums (Ö3 Austria)	21
German Albums (Offizielle Top 100)	4
Swiss Albums (Schweizer Hitparade)	28
