= Songs of Love and Death (Beyond the Black album) =

Studio album by Beyond the Black
- Released: 13 February 2015
- Genre: Symphonic metal
- Length: 55:28
- Label: Airforce1/We Love Music/Universal
- Producer: Hartmut Krech, Mark Nissen, Hannes Braun, Torsten Brötzmann, Sascha Paeth, Ivo Morig

Beyond the Black chronology
Songs of Love and Death (2015)	Lost in Forever (2016)

Singles from Songs of Love and Death
- 1. "In the Shadows" Released: 20 January 2015; 2. "Songs of Love and Death" Released: 28 January 2015; 3. "Love Me Forever" Released: 28 January 2015

Professional ratings
Review scores
Source	Rating
Rock Hard	7.0/10

Songs of Love and Death is the debut studio album by the German symphonic metal band Beyond the Black. It was released on 13 February 2015 through Airforce1 Records.The album was rereleased on 7 June 2019 through Austrian record label Napalm Records.

== Track listing ==
No.	Title	Lyrics	Music	Length
1.	"In the Shadows"	Hartmut Krech, Mark Nissen, Dave Roth	Krech, Nissen, Roth	4:53
2.	"Songs of Love and Death"	Krech, Nissen, Lukas Hainer	Hannes Braun	4:15
3.	"Unbroken"	Hainer	Krech, Nissen	4:26
4.	"When Angels Fall"	Krech, Nissen, Hainer, Braun	Jennifer Haben, Krech, Nissen, Braun	5:22
5.	"Pearl in a World of Dirt"	Nik Page, Kate Northrop	Krech, Nissen, Braun	6:25
6.	"Hallelujah"	Krech, Nissen, Roth	Braun, Krech, Nissen, Roth	5:22
7.	"Running to the Edge"	Hainer	Krech, Nissen	4:54
8.	"Numb"	Torsten Brötzmann, Ivo Morig, Charlie Mason	Brötzmann, Morig, Mason	4:24
9.	"Drowning in Darkness"	Hainer, Braun	Braun	4:11
10.	"Afraid of the Dark"	Brötzmann, Morig, Mason	Brötzmann, Morig, Mason	4:08
11.	"Fall into the Flames"	Arno Krabman, Ashley Hicklin, Haben	Krabman, Hicklin, Haben	3:41
12.	"Love Me Forever" (Motörhead cover)	Michael Richard Burston, Ian Fraser Kilmister, Philip Anthony Campbell, Philip John Taylor	Burston, Kilmister, Campbell, Taylor	3:27
Total length:				55:28

2017 Japanese Edition Bonus Tracks
No.	Title	Length
13.	"In the Shadows" (live)	5:15
Total length:		60:43

== Personnel ==
=== Band (formed after the album recording) ===
- Jennifer Haben – lead vocals
- Nils Lesser – lead guitar
- Christopher Hummels – rhythm guitar & backing vocals
- Erwin Schmidt – bass
- Tobias Derer – drums
- Michael Hauser – keyboards

=== Album musicians ===
- Jennifer Haben – lead vocals
- Sascha Paeth – guitars except on track 7; guitar solo on track 7; bass except on track 7; drums on tracks 8, 10, 11, 12; shouts on track 10; keyboards on track 11
- Ossi Schaller – guitar solo on tracks 1, 3, 4
- Dirk Schlag – acoustic guitars on tracks 2, 5, 6
- Arno Krabman, Bent Wolff – guitars on track 7
- Peter Weihe – guitars on track 12
- Mark Nissen – bass on track 7; all other instruments and programming, additional guitars, strings & backing vocals except on tracks 8, 11, 12
- Hartmut Krech – all other instruments and programming, additional guitars, strings & backing vocals except on tracks 8, 11, 12
- Ivo Moring – drums on track 10
- Michael 'Miro' Rodenberg – keyboards on tracks 8, 10, 11, 12
- Thorsten Brötzmann – keyboards on tracks 8, 10, 12
- Michael Knauer – keyboards on track 12
- Sandro Friedrich – flutes on tracks 1, 5, 6; bagpipes on track 1; shawn on track 5
- Ingo Hampf – lute on track 5
- Hannes Braun – lead vocals on track 5, backing vocals on track 3, shouts on track 4
- Billy King – backing vocals on tracks 2–4, 6–10
- Klaus Esch, Vibeke Andressen – backing vocals on track 6
- Oliver Hartmann – backing vocals on track 11
- Sander Gommans – backing vocals on track 6, shouts on track 6
- Kevin Ratajczak – shouts on track 6, 9
- Christopher Hummels – shouts on track 7

=== Production ===
- Hartmut Krech, Mark Nissen – producers, engineers and mixing on tracks 1–7 and 9
- Hannes Braun – co-producer on tracks 3 and 6
- Thorsten Brötzmann, Ivo Morig – producers on tracks 8, 10, 12
- Sascha Paeth – producer on tracks 8, 10, 11, 12
- Michael 'Miro' Rodenberg – mastering at GateStudio, Wolfsburg, Germany

== Charts ==
Chart (2015)	Peak position
Austrian Albums (Ö3 Austria)	21
German Albums (Offizielle Top 100)	12
