= Saphir (band) =

German pop group

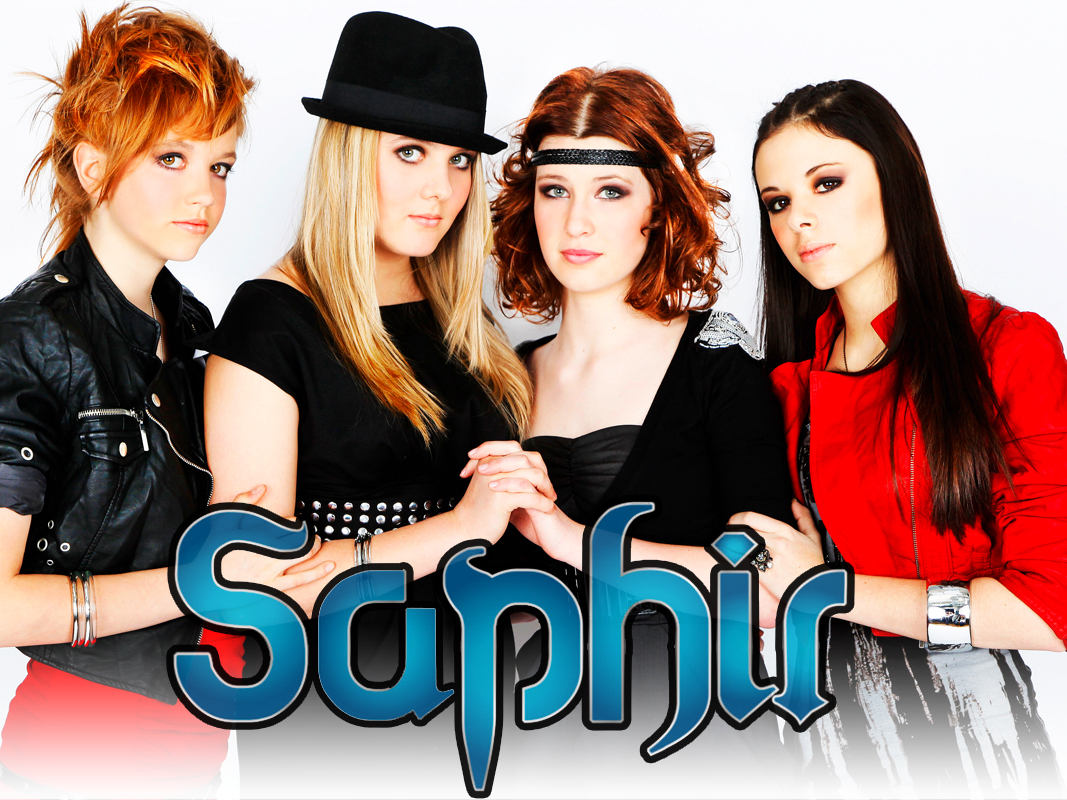
- Amely (13), Lea (15), Kathrin (13), Jenny (14); Promotion wallpaper 2010, Universal

Background information
- Origin: Germany
- Genres: Pop
- Years active: 2010-2011
- Label: Universal Domestic Pop (Germany)
- Members: Jennifer Haben; Lea Sofia Nikiforow; Kathrin Sicks; Amely Sommer
- Website: saphir-music.de

Saphir (German for Sapphire) was an all-female teenage German pop group consisting of four girls. They all were winners of a talent show KI.KA LIVE - Beste Stimme gesucht! (Best voice wanted) on the German TV-station KI.KA ("Der Kinderkanal" = "The Children's Channel"), owned and operated by ARD and ZDF, in the years from 2007 to 2010.

== History ==
Saphir was initiated by Lea Sofia Nikiforow, who won the contest in 2009. She met the former winners Jennifer Haben (2007) and Kathrin Sicks (2008) during the 2009 contest. The girls figured out they had the same taste in music and decided to start a band together. Nikiforow changed her prize, a solo record contract, for the formation of a band and a production of an album. Originally a trio the band was formed in January 2010. The band's management wanted an additional deeper voice so the winner of the 2010 contest should become the fourth member. In April 2010 Amely Sommer won the contest and completed the band. In January 2011 the singers decided to focus on solo projects.

== Discography ==
The exclusively German-singing band released their self-titled debut album in May 2010.

=== Albums ===
- Saphir, 28 May 2010

=== Singles ===
Year	Title	Chart Positions		
Year	Title	AUT	GER	SWI
2010	Orchester in mir	71	44	-
