= Compagnie Meusienne de Chemins de Fer =

Coordinates: 48.78664°N 5.15262°E

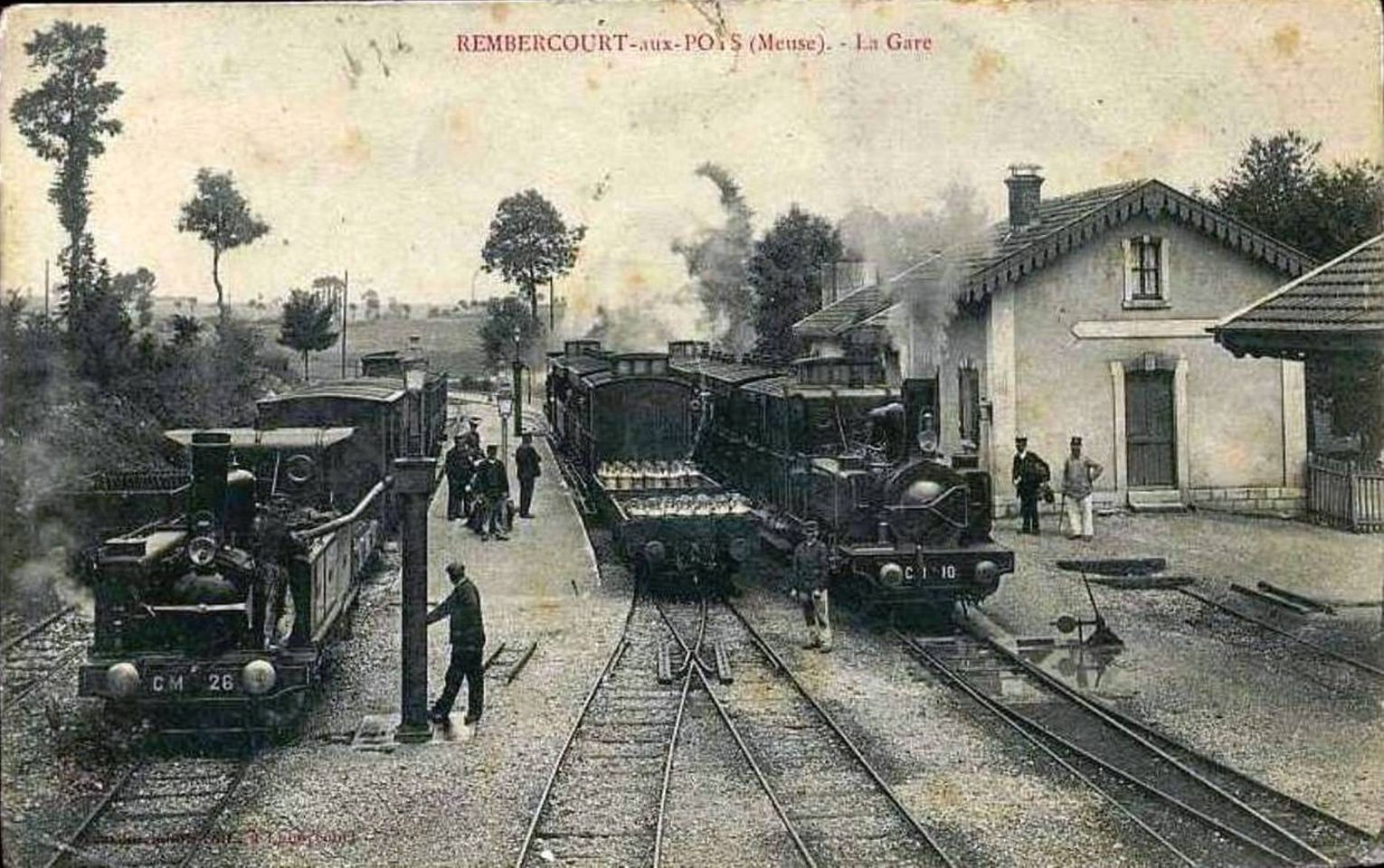
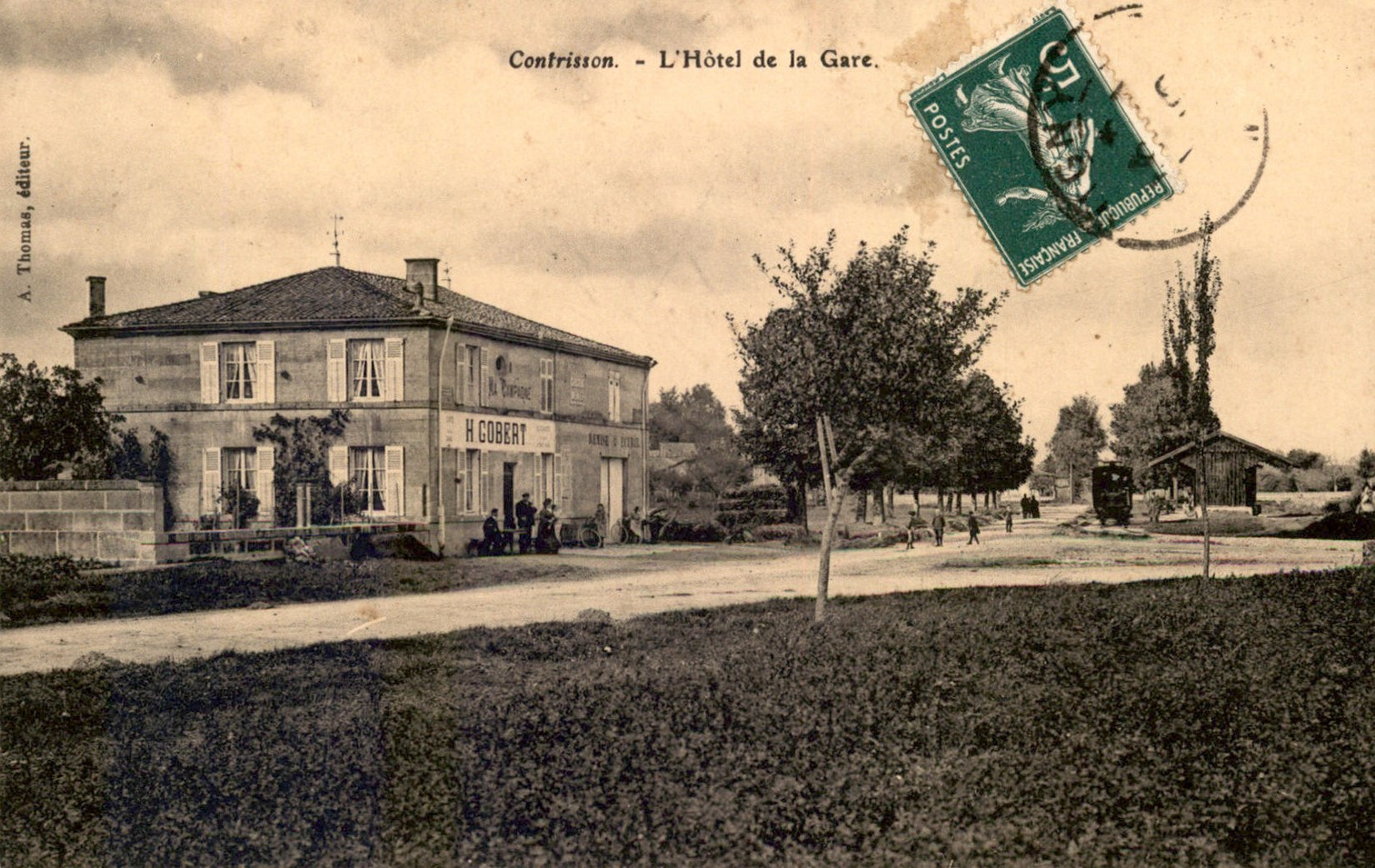
- N° 26 Suzanne (Corpet-Louvet 534/1890 on the left) and N° 10 Verdun (Corpet-Louvet 598/1894 on the right hand side) in Rembercourt L’Hôtel de la Gare beside the small wooden goods shed in Contrisson

Technical
- Line length: 203 km (130 mi)
- Track gauge: 1,000 mm (3 ft 3 3/8 in) metre gauge
Route map
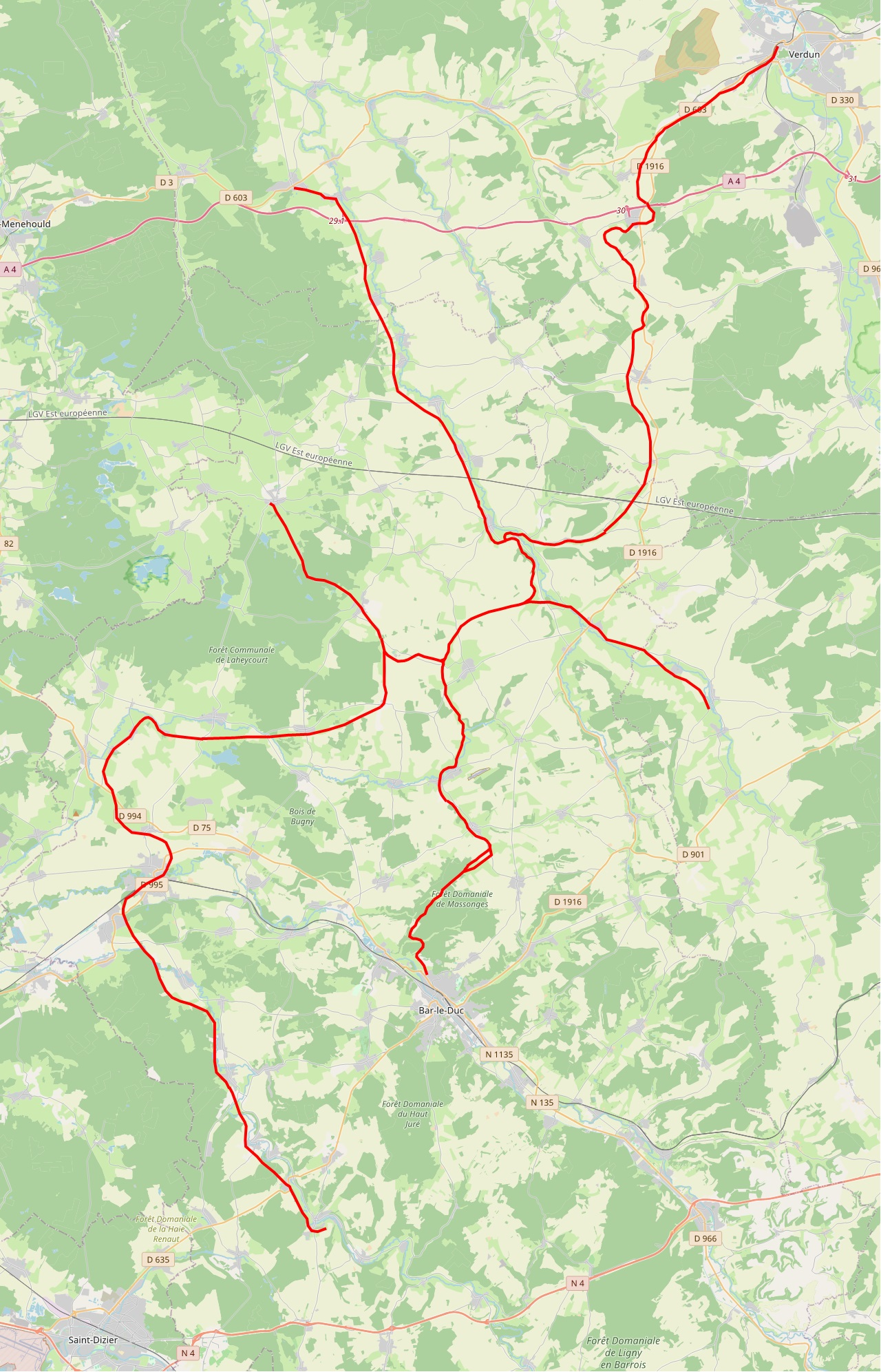
Former network superimposed onto a modern map

The Compagnie Meusienne de Chemins de Fer (colloquially Le Meusien) operated from 1888 to 1922 a 203 km (130 mi) long metre gauge (1,000 mm (3 ft 3 3/8 in)) rail network in the French Département Meuse. Its most westerly branch was built by the Compagnie des Chemins de Fer d'Intérêt Local de la Meuse and commissioned section by section since 1878. The Société Générale des Chemins de Fer Économiques took over the network in 1922 and operated it until decline and closure between 1929 and 1938.

== History ==
=== Construction ===
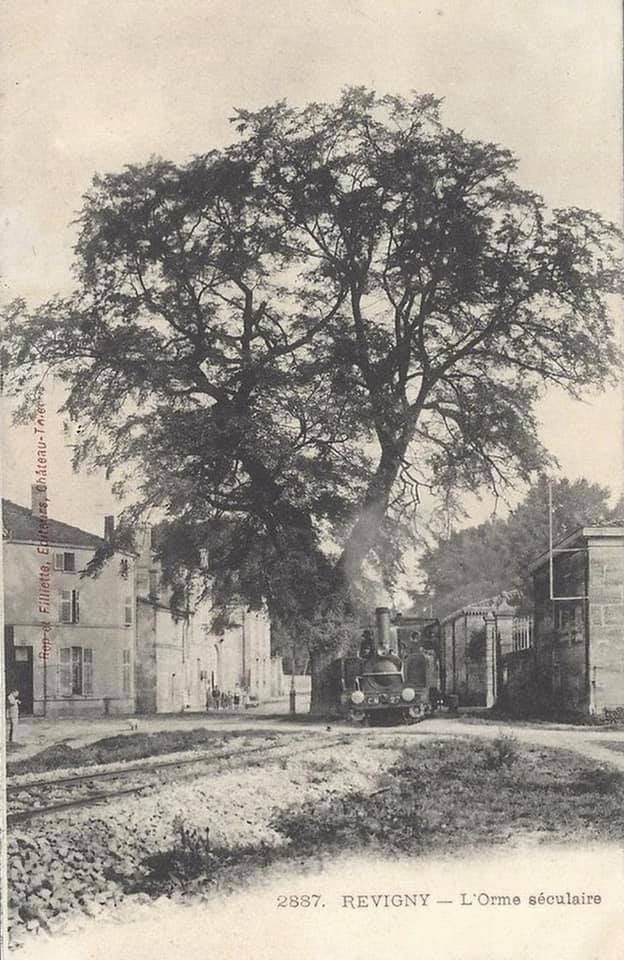
Revigny - The secular elm tree

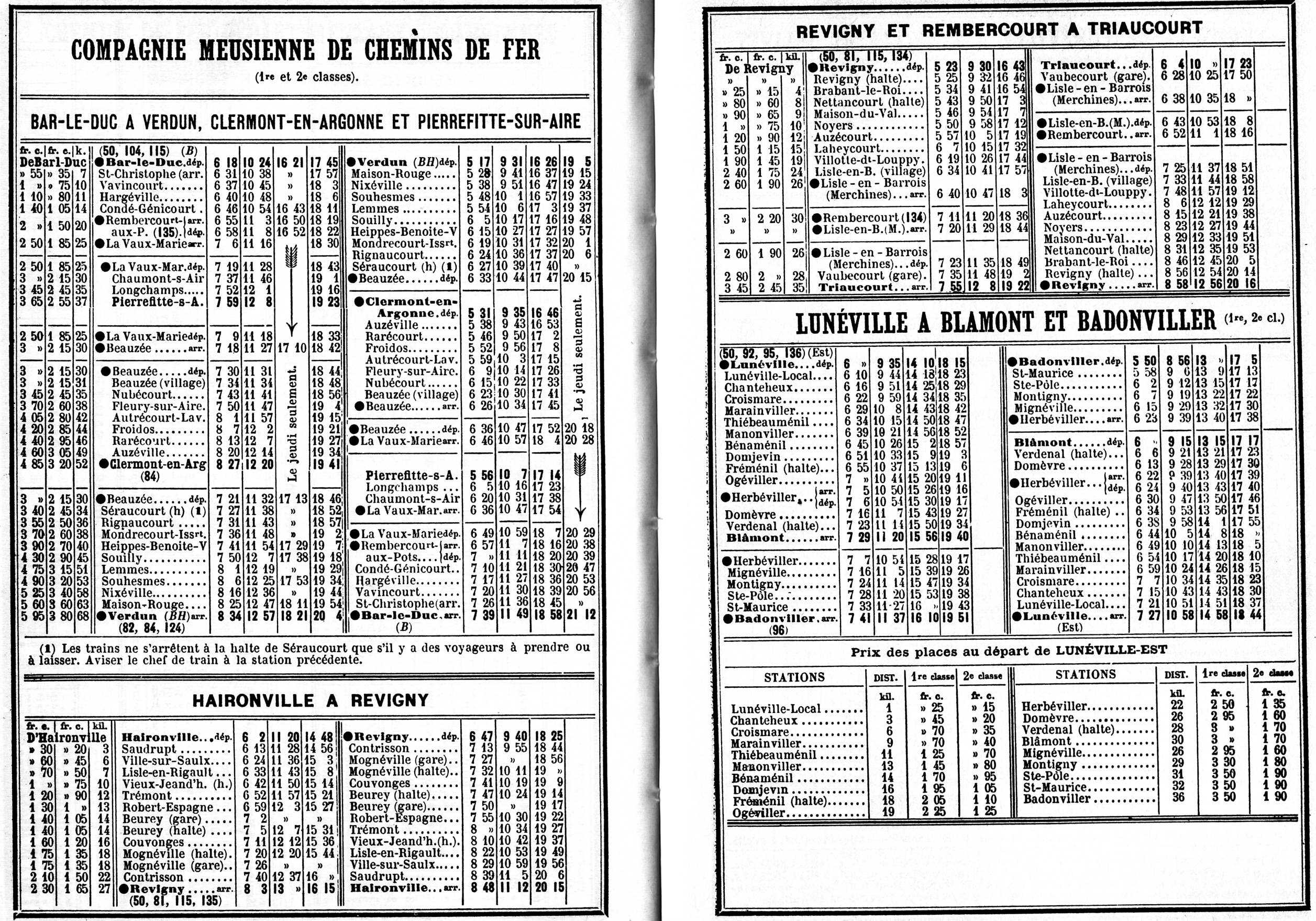
Time table of 1914

The Compagnie des Chemins de fer d'Intérêt Local de la Meuse built and commissioned the first section of the local railway from Haironville via Revigny to Triaucourt from 1878 to 1881 and operated it until 1888. A short connecting line to Rembercourt joined the Triaucourt line at Les Merchines.

The concessionaire, Charles Varinot, had taken control of the line from Haironville to Triaucourt in 1888. The Compagnie Meusienne de Chemins de Fer (CM) took over the concession for the Haironville-Triaucourt line in 1888. Between 1891 and 1912, it put additional lines into service from Bar-le-Duc to Verdun, Clermont-en-Argonne and Pierrefitte-sur-Aire.

After the First World War, Société Générale des Chemins de Fer Économiques took over the network in 1922 and operated it together with the Réseau de la Woëvre northeast of Verdun. It operated the entire network until its gradual closure between 1929 and 1938.

However, a 13 km section between Haironville and Robert-Espagne, which had been regauged to standard gauge in the early 1930s, was still operated by steam engines for freight traffic until 1971.

A 4.2 km section of line north of Bar-le-Duc was reopened as a museum railway.

=== World War I ===
During the World War I, the locomotive fleet of the Compagnie Meusienne de Chemins de Fer (CM) was strengthened by requisitioning locomotives from metre gauge lines in other parts of France, so that up to 128 locomotives were used on the line. One of these was No. 55 (Corpet Louvet 1253/1909) from the Chemins de Fer Économiques des Charentes (EC). By the end of 1915, operational improvements made it possible to handle a very large amount of freight, which had increased from 800 to 1500 tons per day in addition to carrying 80 passengers per day. In the first five months of 1916, traffic increased to 137,367 soldiers, 84,888 wounded, 201,257 tons of supplies and 69,847 tons of ammunition and weapons transport.

During the war, the railway was popularly called "Varinot" after the name of its former concessionaire or "tacot" or "Tortillard" after the sound that it emitted. The military authorities called it the "Petit Tramway" and General Philippe Pétain described it as the "Petit Meusien". By improving the organisation of the traffic, the number of military transports increased from 22 trains on 21 February 1916 to 31 trains at the end of March to 35 at the end of April and finally even up to 48 trains between Revigny and Beauzée.

=== Post-war period ===
The Société Générale des Chemins de Fer Économiques (SE) took over operations in 1922. In the post-war period, from 1919 to 1924, large quantities of building materials were transported along the line for the reconstruction of the destroyed buildings. The trains therefore ran on a timetable as mixed freight and passenger trains, which required numerous shunting manoeuvres in the stations to couple or uncouple additional freight wagons. Because of this and because the maximum speed was limited to 12 km/h, the journeys were very time-consuming.

=== Decline and closure ===
As the economic viability was questioned by rising inflation, the operating company merged with the operators of the local railway lines of the Réseau de la Woëvre, located northeast of Verdun, on 1 June 1923. The merged company acquired more modern rolling stock, in particular railcars. On 20 June 1938, operations had largely ceased and the assets were sold. The liquidation was not yet completed with the outbreak of the Second World War in 1939. It was not until the end of Second World War that the company was fully settled in 1946.

== Sections of track ==
- Revigny – Haironville: 62 km (39 mi)
- Revigny – Triaucourt: 35 km (22 mi)
- Bar-le-Duc – Verdun: 58 km (36 mi)
- Beauzé – Clermont-en-Argonne: 22 km (14 mi)
- Rembercourt-aux-Pots – Les Merchines: 4 km (2.5 mi)
- La Vaux-Marie – Pierrefitte-sur-Aire: 12 km (7.5 mi)

== Stations and bridges ==
Stations and bridges	Photos	Condition of the buildings and comments
Verdun		
Nixéville		
Pampaville		
Souhesmes		
Souilly		
Heippes-Benoite-Vaux		
Clermont-en-Argonne		
		During World War I, there was a 600 mm (1 ft 11 5/8 in) gauge constructor's or trench railway between Clermont-en-Argonne and Auzéville in operation using German locomotives.
Auzéville		
Rarecourt		
Froidos		
Autrécourt-Lavoye		
Fleury-sur-Aire		
Nubécourt		
Beauzée		
Triaucourt		
Vaubecourt		
Chaumont-sur-Aire		
Longchamps-sur-Aire		
Pierrefitte-sur-Aire		
La Vaux-Marie		
L'Isle-en-Barrois		
Villotte-devant-Louppy		
Laheycourt		
Auzecourt		
Noyers		
Maison-du-Val		The timber frame station hut is still preserved
Nettancourt		
Revigny		
Contrisson		The brick-built station hut is Der aus Ziegelsteinen still preserved.
Neuville-sur-Ornain		
Canal de la Marne au Rhin		
Mognéville		The track ran on the main street through the village
Robert-Espagne		
L'Isle-en-Rigault		
Saudrupt		The track ran on the main street through the village
Haironville		N° 26 Suzanne (Corpet-Louvet 534 of 1890) in Haironville. The station building is still preserved.
Rembercourt-aux-Pots		N° 11 Bar-le-Duc war eine B'1-Lok von Corpet-Louvet (Works-No 599 of 1894). The station building is still preserved.
Condé-Génicourt		
Hargeville		
Vavincourt		
Saint-Christophe bei Vavincourt, Forêt de Massonge		
Chemin de Fer Historique de la Voie Sacrée		
Canal de la Marne au Rhin		The railway bridge shown in the background ran diagonally across the canal. Not preserved.
Bar-le-Duc		Station building with a military horse-drawn ambulance of the 6^{e} Corps and a guard house, 1916. Preserved unter the ownership and management of Le Conseil Départemental de la Meuse.

== Locomotives ==
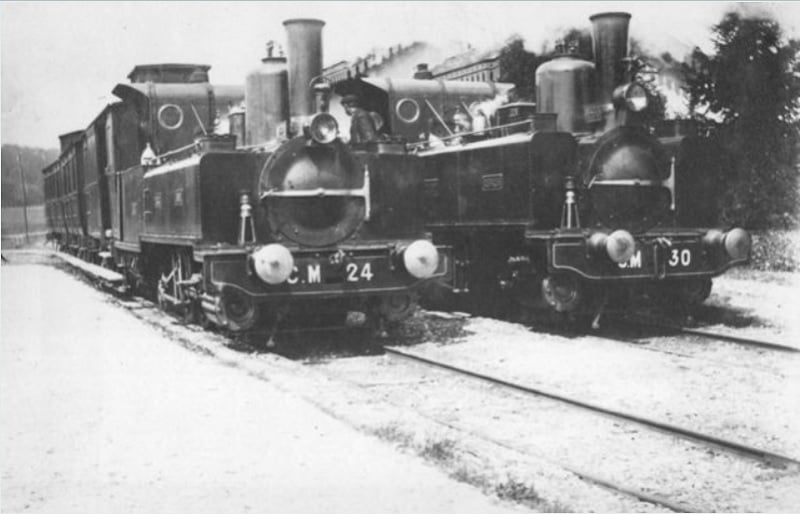
N° 24 Aisne (Corpet 506 of 1889) and N° 30 Georges (Corpet 579 of 1893) in Lisle-en-Barrois also known as Les Merchines

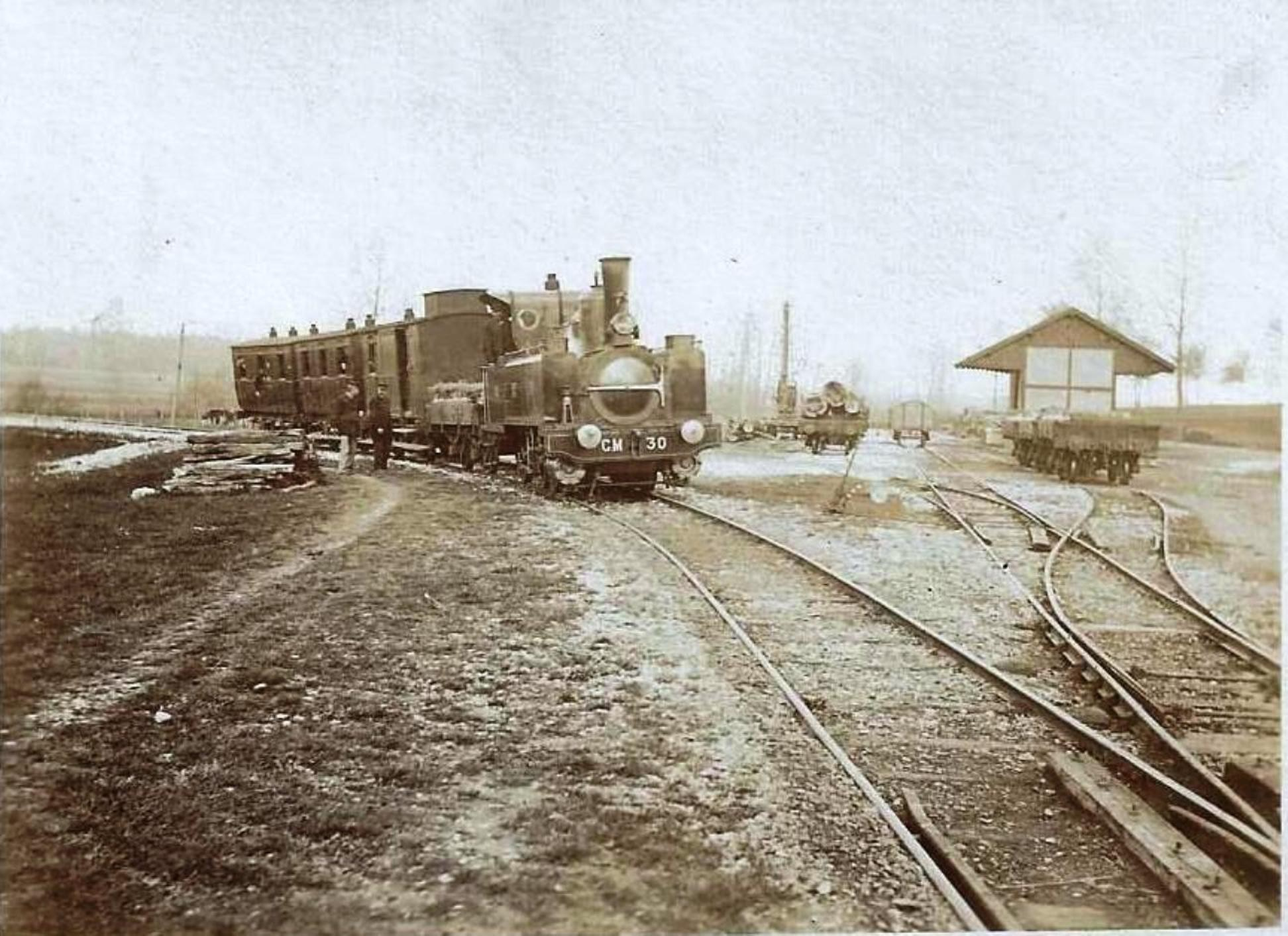
N° 30 Georges (Corpet N° 579 of 1893) in Vaubecourt en route from Haironville to Thiaucourt

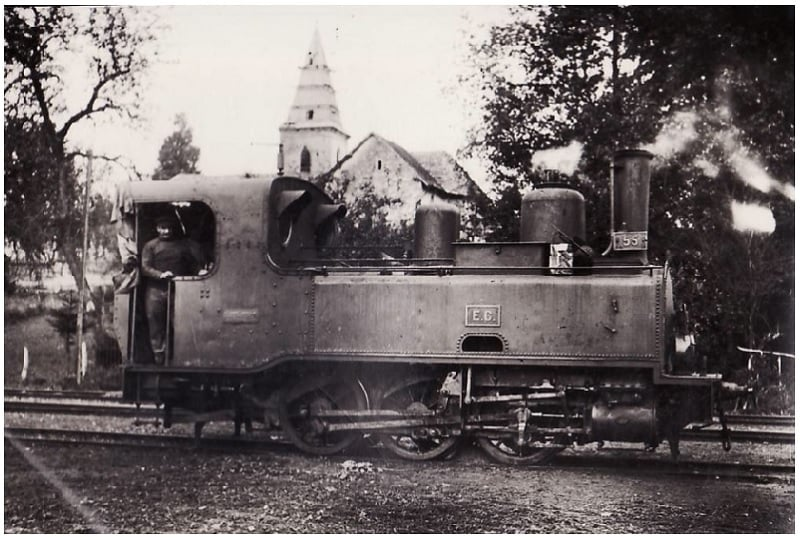
N°55 (Corpet-Louvet 1253 of 1909) of the Chemins de Fer Économiques des Charentes (EC) used on La Meusien near Villotte-devant-Louppy between Revigny and Triaucourt

Manufacturer	Works No	Notation	Delivery date	Other owners	CF No	Name
Ateliers Petau à Passy		C n2t	1878	Mallet two-cylinder compound engines	Cie Meusienne de CF "1" – "5"	
Corpet	294	Cn2t	20.10.1879	Vignaud & Barbaud "La Charente"; Charles Varinot "6" until 1886	Cie Meusienne de CF "28"	
Corpet	362	Cn2t	10.12.1881	Allard Frères until 1883	Cie Meusienne de CF "28"	"La Ville de Neubourg" "Charente"
Corpet	382	Cn2t	07.08.1882	Entreprise Charles Varinot; CF de la Meuse "5"	Cie Meusienne de CF "25"	"Elisa"
Corpet	447	C1'n2t	1885		Cie Meusienne de CF "1"	"L'Aire"
Corpet	448	C1'n2t	1885		Cie Meusienne de CF "2"	"La Meuse"
Corpet	449	C1'n2t	1885		Cie Meusienne de CF "3"	"Tannois"
Corpet	500	C1'n2t	10.12.1889	Exposition de Paris 1889	Cie Meusienne de CF "7"	"Bernard"
Corpet	506	First Cn2t; Later C1'n2t	05.11.1889		Cie Meusienne de CF "4"/"24"	"L'Aisne"
Corpet	534	C1'n2t	10.12.1890	Département de la Meuse "6"	Cie Meusienne de CF "26"	"Suzanne"
Corpet	535	C1'n2t	23.12.1890	Département de la Meuse "7"	Cie Meusienne de CF "27"	"Marguerite"
Corpet	550	B1'n2t	29.03.1892		Cie Meusienne de CF "8"	"Varinot"
Corpet & Louvet	578	C1'n2t	28.04.1893		Cie Meusienne de CF "29"	"Germaine"
Corpet & Louvet	579	C1'n2t	10.05.1893		Cie Meusienne de CF "30"	"Georges"
Corpet & Louvet	597	B1'n2t	15.06.1894		Cie Meusienne de CF "9"	"Andrée"
Corpet & Louvet	598	B1'n2t	26.06.1894		Cie Meusienne de CF "10"	"Verdun"
Corpet & Louvet	599	B1'n2t	09.07.1894	Since 1927 Morillon, Corvol & Cie, Seine-Port	Cie Meusienne de CF "11"	"Bar-le-Duc"
Corpet & Louvet	1230	C1't	26.06.1911		Cie Meusienne de CF "31"	"Caville"
Corpet & Louvet	1231	C1't	30.06.1911		Cie Meusienne de CF "32"	"Pierrefitte"

== Duration of the sections' operation ==
Section	Length	Gauge	Inauguration	Closure	Remarks
Revigny – Couvonges	11 km	1,000 mm (3 ft 3 3/8 in)	1878	1929	
Couvonge – L'Isle-en-Rigault	9 km	1000 mm	1879	1929	Later, there were 1,435 mm (4 ft 8 1/2 in) standard gauge gauge tracks on the Robert-Espagne-Haironville section of the line.
L'Isle-en-Rigault – Haironville	7 km	1000 mm	1881	1929	Later, there were 1,435 mm (4 ft 8 1/2 in) standard gauge gauge tracks on the Robert-Espagne-Haironville section of the line.
Revigny – Laheycourt	15 km	1000 mm	1879	1936	
Laheycourt – Triaucourt	20 km	1000 mm	1880	1936	
Bar-le-Duc – Beauzé	30 km	1000 mm	1891	1936	A 4.2 km section of the line was restored for tourist use as a heritage railway.
Beauzé – Verdun	38 km	1000 mm	1895	1936	During World War, a 7.2 kilometres (4.5 mi) long branch line was built between Nixéville and Dugny
Beauzé – Clermont-en-Argonne	22 km	1000 mm	1891	1936	
Rembercourt-aux-Pots – Les Merchines	4 km	1000 mm	1893	1936	
La-Vaux-Marie – Pierrefitte-sur-Aire	12 km	1000 mm	1912	1936	
