= Canton of Pierrefitte-sur-Aire =

Former canton in Meuse, France

Coordinates: 48°53′51″N 5°17′20″E

- Former canton
- Location of the canton in the arrondissement of Commercy
- Country: France
- Region: Grand Est
- Department: Meuse
- No. of communes: {{{nbcomm}}}
- Disbanded: 2014

Government
  - Representatives: Christian Namy
- Area: 298.89 km^{2} (115.40 sq mi)
- Population (2012): 3,565
  - Density: 11.93/km^{2} (30.89/sq mi)

The canton of Pierrefitte-sur-Aire (French: Canton de Pierrefitte-sur-Aire) is a former French canton located in the department of Meuse in the Lorraine region (now part of Grand Est). This canton was organized around Pierrefitte-sur-Aire in the arrondissement of Commercy. It is now part of the canton of Dieue-sur-Meuse.

The last general councillor from this canton was Christian Namy (DVD), elected in 1985.

== History ==
The canton of Pierrefitte was part of the district of Saint-Mihiel, created by the decree of 30 January 1790.

After the abolition of the districts in 1795, the canton became part of the arrondissement of Commercy when it was created in 1801.

In 1924, following the renaming of the main town of Pierrefitte to Pierrefitte-sur-Aire, the canton also changed its name to become the canton of Pierrefitte-sur-Aire.

Following the cantonal reorganization of 2014, the canton was abolished. All the communes were integrated into the canton of Dieue-sur-Meuse.

== Composition ==
The canton of Pierrefitte-sur-Aire grouped together 26 municipalities and had 3,565 inhabitants (2012 census without double counts).

1. Bannoncourt
2. Baudrémont
3. Belrain
4. Bouquemont
5. Courcelles-en-Barrois
6. Courouvre
7. Dompcevrin
8. Fresnes-au-Mont
9. Gimécourt
10. Kœur-la-Grande
11. Kœur-la-Petite
12. Lahaymeix
13. Lavallée
14. Levoncourt
15. Lignières-sur-Aire
16. Longchamps-sur-Aire
17. Ménil-aux-Bois
18. Neuville-en-Verdunois
19. Nicey-sur-Aire
20. Pierrefitte-sur-Aire
21. Rupt-devant-Saint-Mihiel
22. Sampigny
23. Thillombois
24. Ville-devant-Belrain
25. Villotte-sur-Aire
26. Woimbey
