= Voie Sacrée =

Road that connects Bar-le-Duc to Verdun (Meuse), France

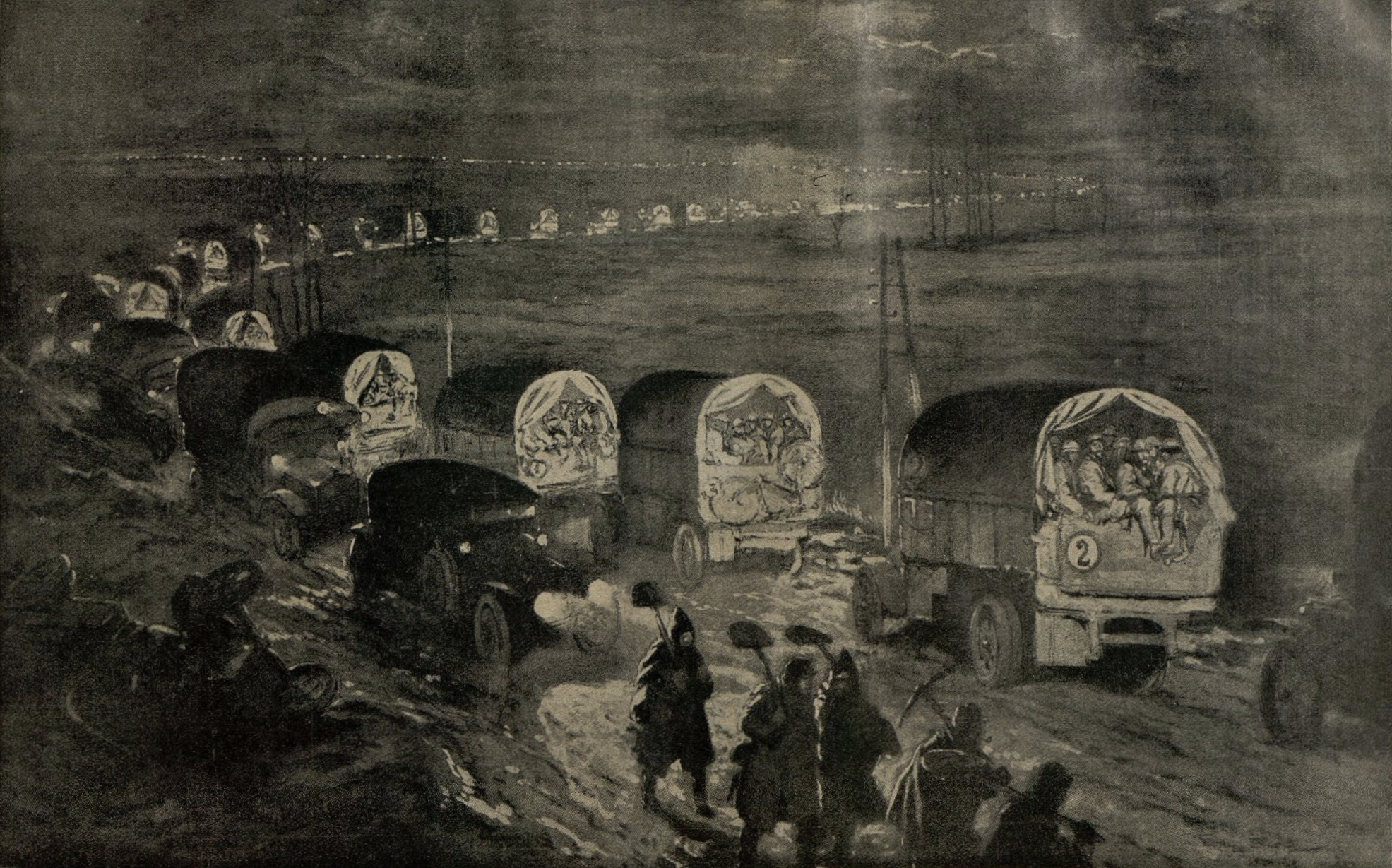
French illustration of the road during the battle of Verdun

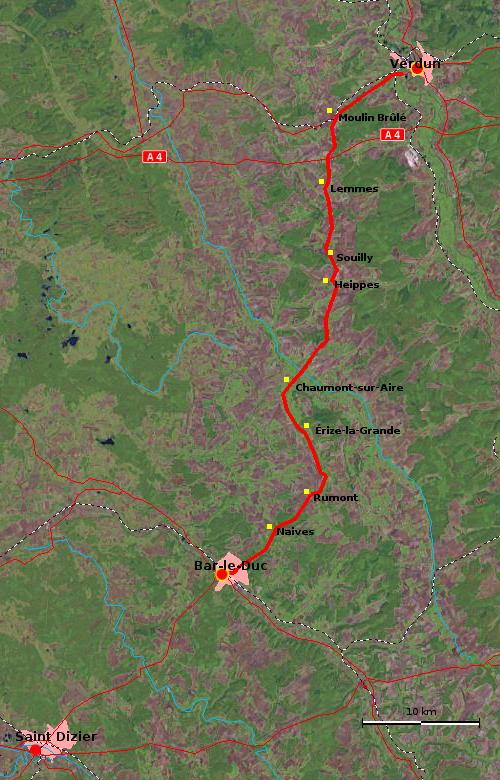
Map of Voie Sacrée, France

The Voie Sacrée (French for 'Sacred Way' / 'Sacred Road') is a road that connects Bar-le-Duc to Verdun (Meuse), France. It was given its name because of the vital role it played during the Battle of Verdun in World War I.

== Use during WWI ==
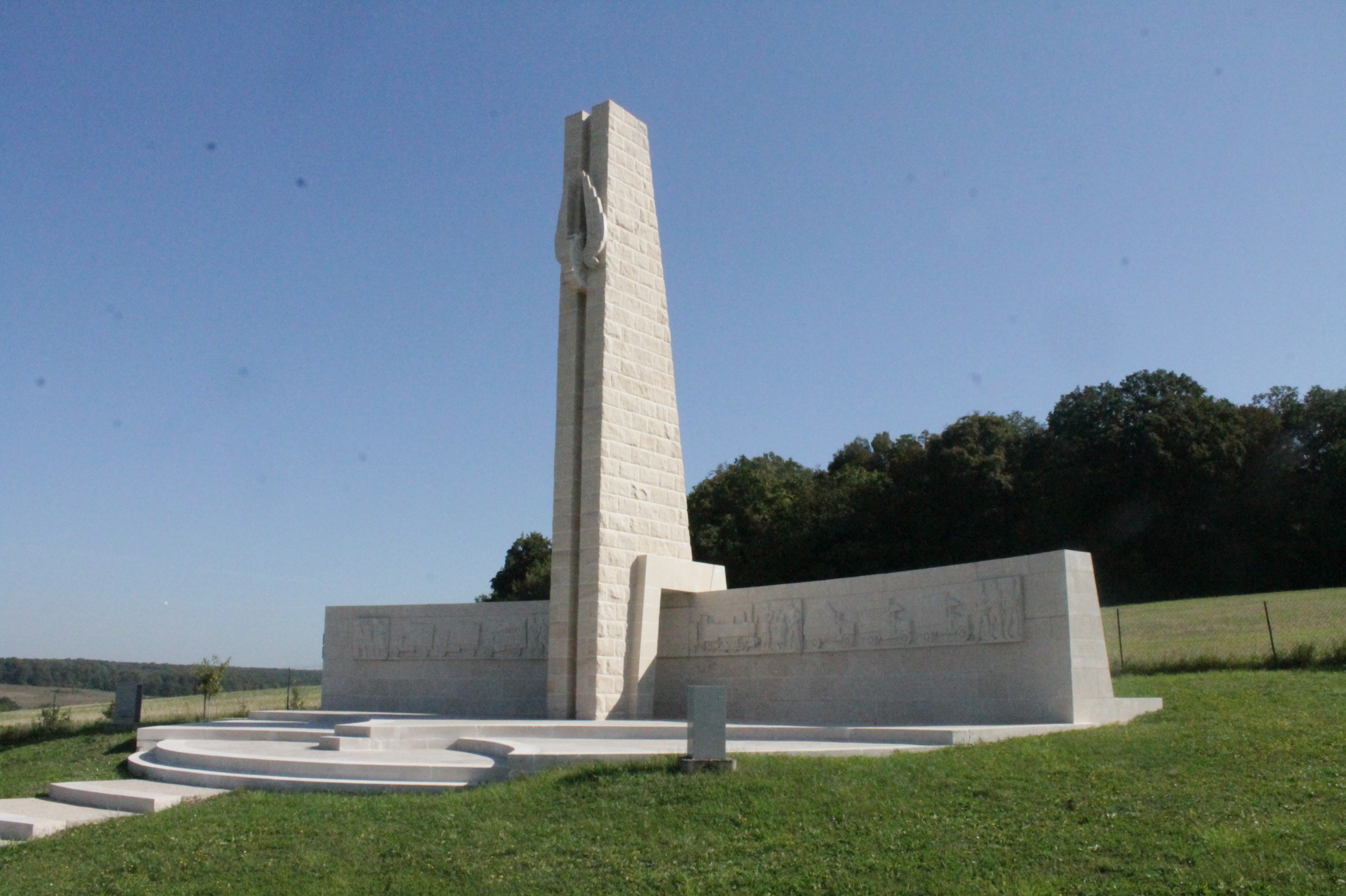
Monument to the Voie Sacrée, south-west of Verdun

After March 1916, along the 72 km (45 miles) of the Voie Sacrée, transport vehicles were on the move day and night, ferrying troops, armaments, and supplies to the Verdun battlefield. During the initial crisis of 21 February to 22 March, 600 trucks per day had already delivered 48,000 tons of ammunition, 6,400 tons of other materiel and 263,000 men to the battlefield. Beginning on 21 February, all horse-drawn traffic and troop movements on foot had been ordered off the road, leaving it open for truck and motorcar traffic only. After March 1916, one truck passed every 14 seconds, submitting the road to considerable wear and tear. Quarries had to be opened nearby to supply the road with crushed stone. Over the course of ten months, 16 labour battalions worked to keep the road in good shape and order. The road had been recognised since 1915 as the only reliable vehicular road that remained in existence to supply Verdun safely. All the standard-gauge railway lines that could reach Verdun had already been interrupted by German forces in late 1914. To compensate for this precarious situation, the road had been widened to 7 metres (23 ft) during 1915, so it could accommodate the continuous up and down flow of two lines of truck traffic. This preemptive roadway improvement in 1915, plus success in organising the transport system on the road (a mission supervised by Colonel Maurice de Barescut, the Chief of Staff of the French Second Army), is what saved Verdun in 1916.

A special unit responsible for controlling traffic and servicing the vehicles numbered 300 officers and 8,500 men. The rolling stock was made up of 3500 Berliet and Renault trucks plus 800 ambulances, the latter often being Ford Model Ts. Thirty breakdown trucks remained on the road at all times with repair crews stationed beside them. Any disabled vehicle was immediately moved to the roadside so as not to interrupt the flow of traffic. Automobile repair shops in Bar-le-Duc and Troyes worked ceaselessly as did hydraulic presses that renewed the trucks' solid rubber tyres.

The Meusien, a narrow-gauge single track railway, ran parallel to the roadside and was able to move 1,800 tons of supplies per day. This included the bulk of the food for the army at Verdun – some 16,600 officers, 420,000 men, and 136,000 horses – and brought back many wounded from the front. Beginning in March 1916, a standard gauge railway bypass was placed under accelerated construction: the Sommeilles-Nettancourt to Dugny line. During the summer of 1916, it would reconnect Verdun to the regional standard gauge network.

== Present day ==
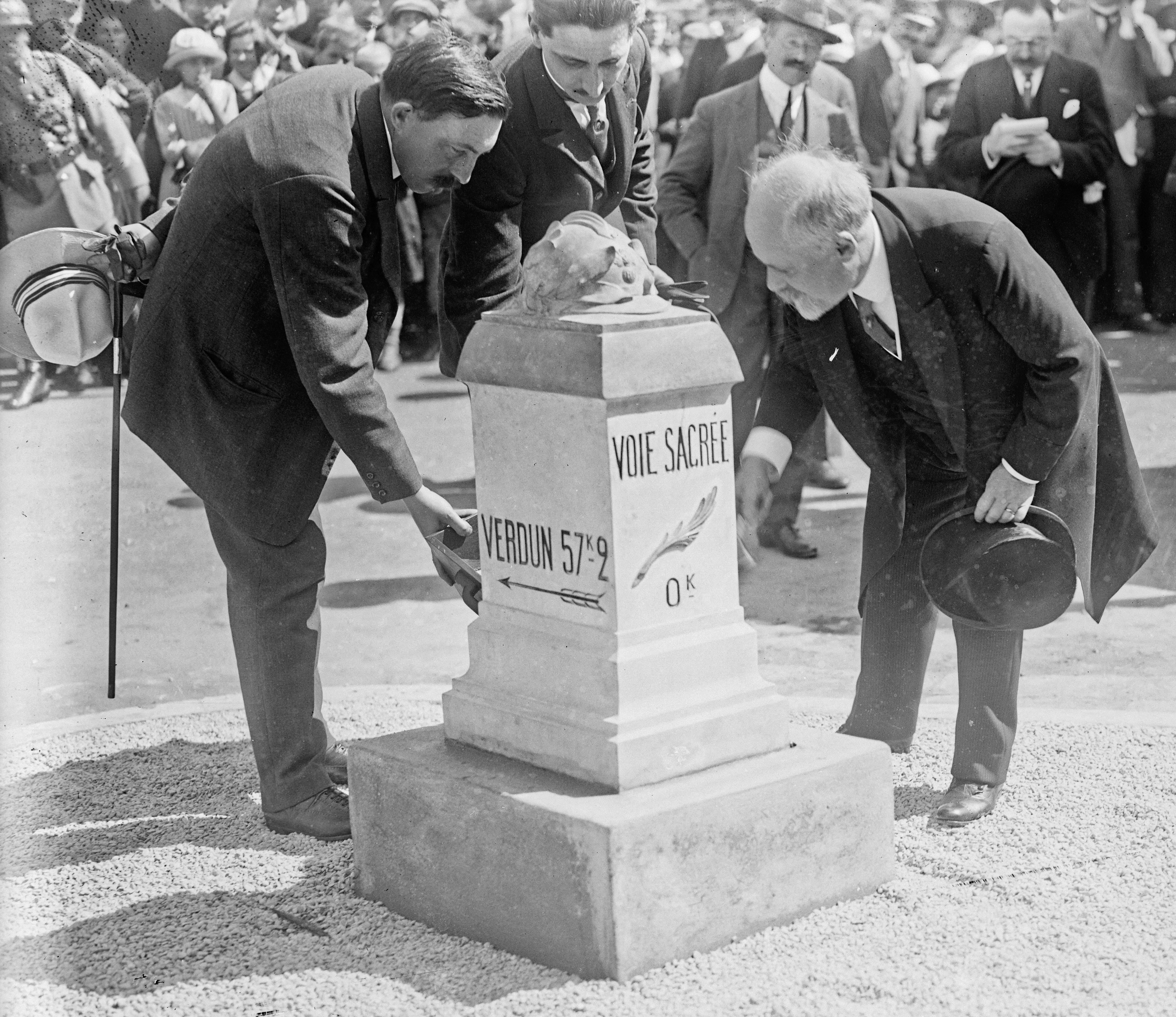
Inauguration of the first borne marking the Voie Sacrée by President Raymond Poincaré in 1923.

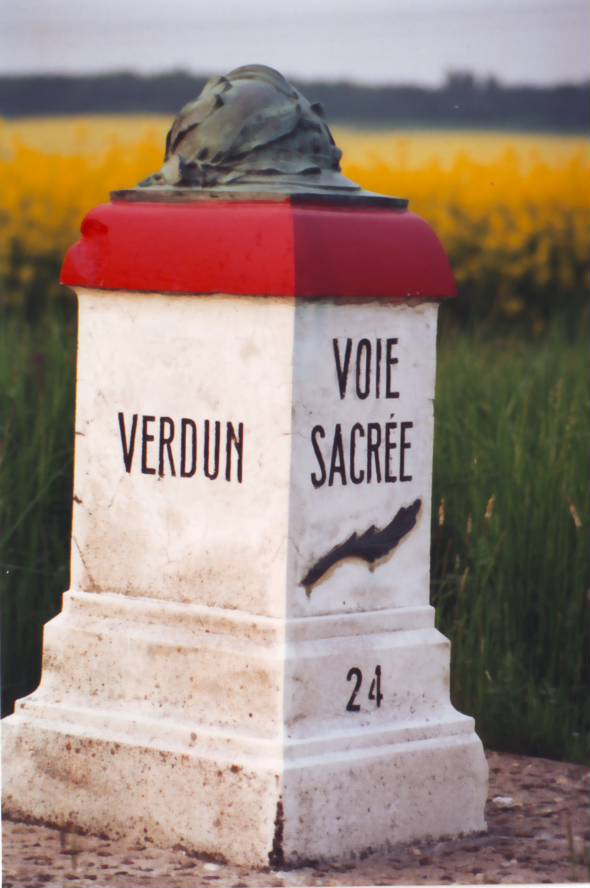
A borne marking theVoie Sacrée.

The Voie Sacrée still exists, but it has been paved over and is now an active secondary road. In 2006, the route was renumbered RD1916, a reference to the road's most critical year. From 1923, the Voie Sacrée was marked by a borne every kilometre along the route. Each borne is topped with a sculpture of an Adrian helmet, the helmet worn by French soldiers during the Battle of Verdun.

The town hall in the village of Souilly, on the Voie Sacrée, served as headquarters to Generals Philippe Pétain and Robert Nivelle during the Battle of Verdun. A large, well-preserved, two-storey stone building fronting on the Voie Sacrée, the Souilly town hall is still in official use today. Several plaques on its facade remind the visitor of the historic role it played in 1916 during the Battle of Verdun and, later in 1918, during the Meuse–Argonne offensive.

== See also ==
- Zone rouge
- Voie Sacrée wind farm

== Sources ==
- Eggenberger, David (1 January 1985). An Encyclopedia of Battles: Accounts of Over 1,560 Battles from 1479 B.C. to the Present. Courier Corporation. ISBN 978-0-486-24913-1.
- Hansen, Arlen J. (1996). Gentlemen Volunteers: The Story of the American Ambulance Drivers in the Great War, August 1914-September 1918. Arcade Publishing. ISBN 978-1-55970-313-0.
- Tucker, Spencer (4 January 2002). The Great War, 1914-1918. Routledge. ISBN 978-1-134-81750-4.
