= Adrian l'Alemant =

Adrian l'Alemant (1527–1559) was a French author, translator, and medic.

== Life ==
l'Alemant was born in Sorcy-sur-Meuse in 1527. He died in Paris in 1559. By 1553, he was a Doctor of Medicine at the University of Paris.

== Works ==
l'Alemant wrote or translated a number of books on medicine and philosophy:

- De optimo genere disputandi libri III (1546)
- Ars Parva (1549)
- Dialectique en françois pour les barbiers et les chirurgiens (1553)
- Hippocratis medicorum omnium principis de flatibus liber (1557)
- De aere, aquis, & locis, liber olim mancus, nunc integer: qui Galeno, De habitationibus, & aquis, & temporibus & regionibus (1557)

The Dialectique is one of the earliest known vernacular French books on dialectic, or logic, predating Petrus Ramus's Dialectique by two years.
