= Voie Sacrée wind farm =

Wind farm in France

- Country: France
- Coordinates: 48°54′N 5°12′E
- Status: Operational
- Commission date: 2007

Wind farm
- Rotor diameter: 90 m (300 ft)

Power generation
- Units operational: 27 × 2 MW
- Make and model: Gamesa G90-2.0 MW (27)
- Nameplate capacity: 54 MW

The Voie Sacrée wind farm is a wind farm located in the Lorraine region of France.

It is shared between the cities of Beausite, Raival, Courcelles-sur-aire, Érize-la-petite, and Maurechamp, not far from the Voie Sacrée. The onshore wind farm was proposed and installed in 2007, and today contains 27 Siemens Gamesa G90/2000 wind turbines, each with a hub height of 78 meters and diameter of 90 meters. Individually, each of the Voie Sacrée wind turbines has a rated capacity of 2,000 kW, for a total capacity of 54,000 kW for the wind farm.

In 2013, the power contribution from the Voie Sacrée wind farm accounted for approximately 0.65% of the total wind power in France (8,254 MW). The wind farm developer is SFE Française d’Eoliennes and the farm is currently owned and operated by Sorgenia France. Voie Sacrée is a contributor to French wind power Zone 55.
