= Heillecourt =

- Commune
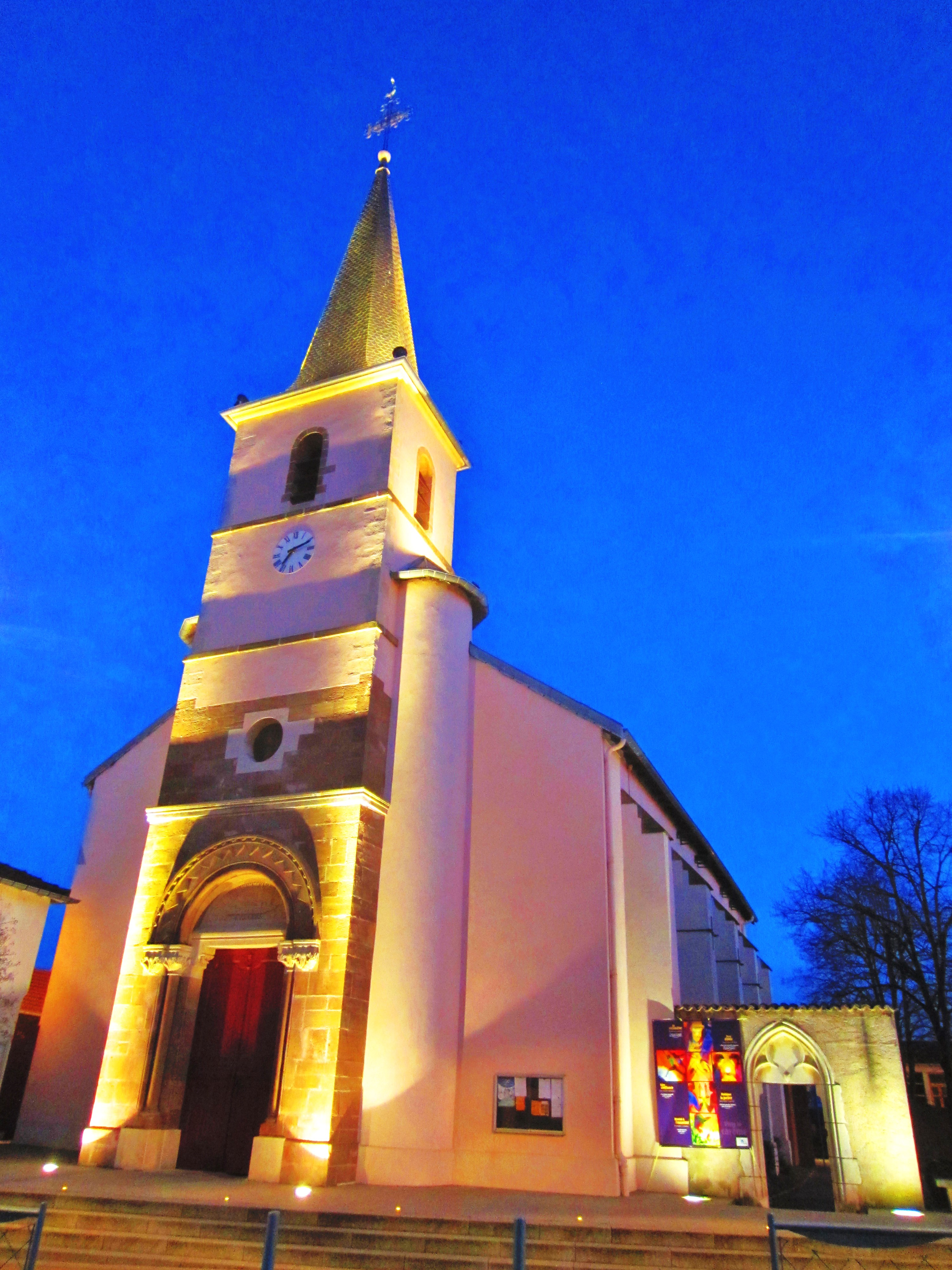
- The church in Heillecourt

- Coat of arms
- Location of Heillecourt
- Location within France Location within Grand Est
- Coordinates: 48°39′11″N 6°11′42″E
- Country: France
- Region: Grand Est
- Department: Meurthe-et-Moselle
- Arrondissement: Nancy
- Canton: Jarville-la-Malgrange
- Intercommunality: Métropole du Grand Nancy

Government
  - Mayor (2020–2026): Didier Sartelet
- Area^{1}: 3.65 km^{2} (1.41 sq mi)
- Elevation: 238 m (781 ft)
- Highest elevation: 260 m (850 ft)
- Lowest elevation: 211 m (692 ft)
- Population (2023): 5,414
  - Density: 1,480/km^{2} (3,840/sq mi)
- Time zone: UTC+01:00 (CET)
  - Summer (DST): UTC+02:00 (CEST)
- INSEE/Postal code: 54257 /54180
- ^{1} French Land Register data, which excludes lakes, ponds, glaciers > 1 km^{2} (0.386 sq mi or 247 acres) and river estuaries.

Heillecourt (French pronunciation: [ɛjkuʁ]) is a commune in the Meurthe-et-Moselle department in north-eastern France. The 18th-century French historian, diplomat and Encyclopédiste Jean-Baptiste Luton Durival (1725–1810) died in Heillecourt as well as his brother Nicolas Luton Durival (1713–1795).

== Population ==
Historical population
| Year | Pop. | ±% p.a. |
|---|---|---|
| 1968 | 1,000 | — |
| 1975 | 2,057 | +10.85% |
| 1982 | 5,028 | +13.62% |
| 1990 | 6,393 | +3.05% |
| 1999 | 6,185 | −0.37% |
| 2007 | 5,967 | −0.45% |
| 2012 | 5,691 | −0.94% |
| 2017 | 5,527 | −0.58% |
| 2023 | 5,414 | −0.34% |
Source: INSEE

== See also ==
- Communes of the Meurthe-et-Moselle department
