= Saint-Aubin-sur-Aire =

- Commune
- Coat of arms
- Location of Saint-Aubin-sur-Aire
- Location within France Location within Grand Est
- Coordinates: 48°42′26″N 5°26′36″E
- Country: France
- Region: Grand Est
- Department: Meuse
- Arrondissement: Commercy
- Canton: Vaucouleurs

Government
  - Mayor (2020–2026): Hugues Beauseigneur
- Area^{1}: 14.17 km^{2} (5.47 sq mi)
- Elevation: 343 m (1,125 ft)
- Highest elevation: 392 m (1,286 ft)
- Lowest elevation: 273 m (896 ft)
- Population (2023): 178
  - Density: 12.6/km^{2} (32.5/sq mi)
- Time zone: UTC+01:00 (CET)
  - Summer (DST): UTC+02:00 (CEST)
- INSEE/Postal code: 55454 /55500
- ^{1} French Land Register data, which excludes lakes, ponds, glaciers > 1 km^{2} (0.386 sq mi or 247 acres) and river estuaries.

Saint-Aubin-sur-Aire (French pronunciation: [sɛ̃t‿obɛ̃ syʁ ɛːʁ]; literally "Saint Albin on Aire") is a commune in the Meuse department in Grand Est in north-eastern France. The 18th-century French historian, diplomat and Encyclopédiste Jean-Baptiste Luton Durival (1725–1810) was born in Saint-Aubin-sur-Aire.

== See also ==
- Communes of the Meuse department
