= Louis, Count of Clermont =

French royal; grandson of Louis XIV (1709–1771)

Louis de Bourbon
- Count of Clermont
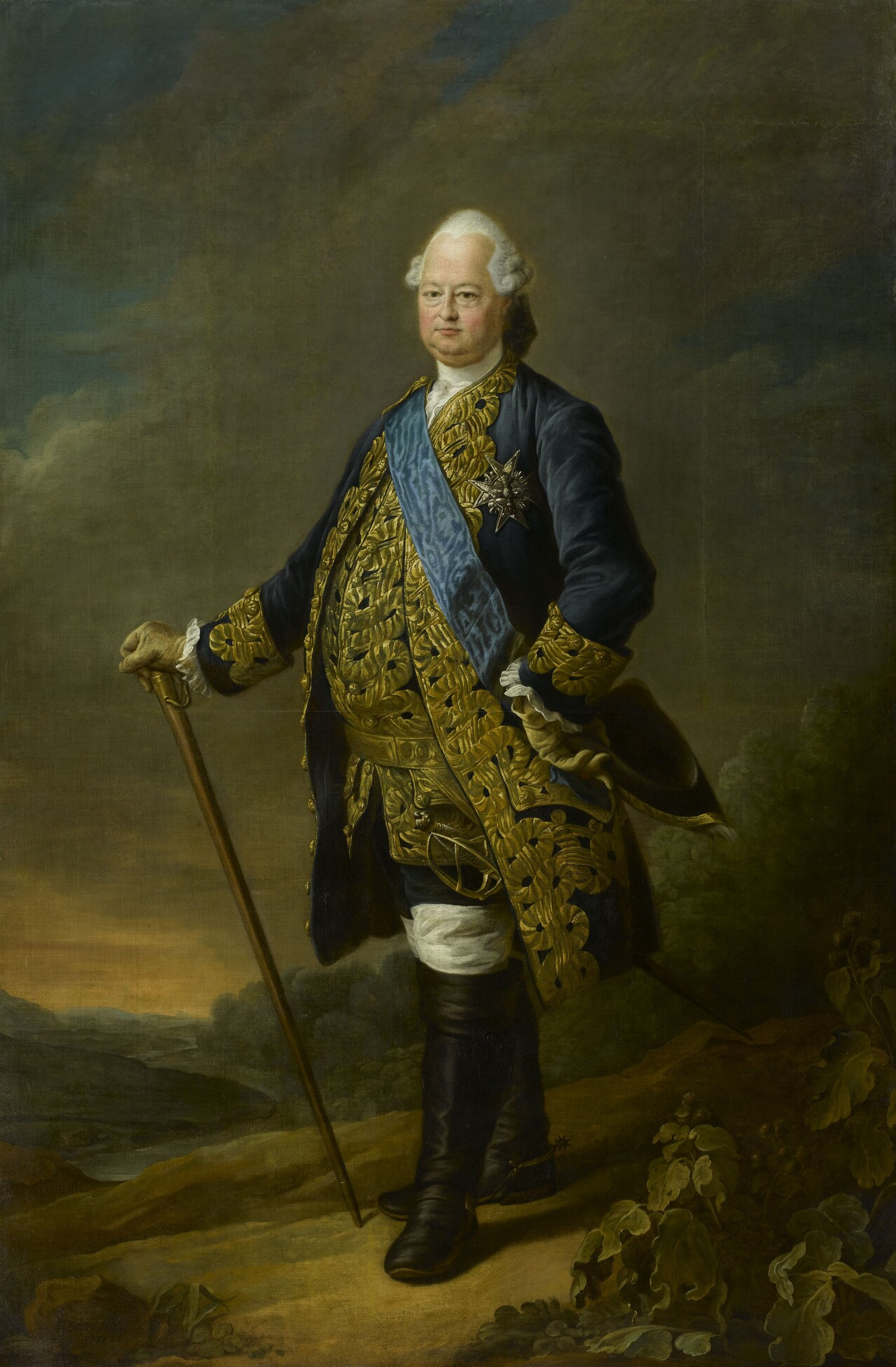
- Portrait by Drouais, 1771
- Born: 15 June 1709; Palace of Versailles, France
- Died: 16 June 1771 (aged 62); Paris, France
Names
- Louis de Bourbon
- Father: Louis, Duke of Bourbon, Prince of Condé
- Mother: Louise Françoise de Bourbon

Louis de Bourbon (15 June 1709 – 16 June 1771) was a member of the cadet branch of the then reigning House of Bourbon. He is known for leading French forces in Germany during the Seven Years' War where he took command in 1758 following the failed French Invasion of Hanover. He was unable to break through Ferdinand of Brunswick's Anglo-German army and capture Hanover. He was Count of Clermont from birth.

== Biography ==
Louis was born on 15 June 1709 at the Palace of Versailles. A prince of the blood, he was the third and youngest son of Louis de Bourbon, "Duke of Bourbon", Prince of Condé (1668–1710) and Louise Françoise de Bourbon, Mademoiselle de Nantes (1673–1743), a legitimated daughter of King Louis XIV and his maîtresse-en-titre Madame de Montespan. He was also the great-grandson of Louis, Grand Condé, who died in 1687.

A possible bride was his first cousin, Mademoiselle du Maine, but a union never materialised.

From 1730, he was a lover of Duchess of Bouillon, wife of Emmanuel Théodose de La Tour d'Auvergne, mother of the future Princess of Beauvau.

His eldest brother, Louis Henri, Duke of Bourbon, was the head of Condé family from 1710 until his death in 1740, and was Louis XV's Premier Ministre (prime minister) from 1723 to 1726. He raised his nephew Louis Joseph, Prince of Condé who was an orphan from 1741.

"He was a curious character: prince of the blood, abbé [of Saint-Germain-des-Prés and other abbeys, including Chaalis that was rebuilt by his order], military officer, libertine, man of letters (or at least a member of the Academy), anti-Parlement, religious during his final years, he was one of the most striking examples (and one of the most amusing on certain days) and also one of the most shocking (although not at all odious), of the abuses and disparities pushed to scandal, under the Old Order, of pleasure and privilege." (Charles Augustin Sainte-Beuve).

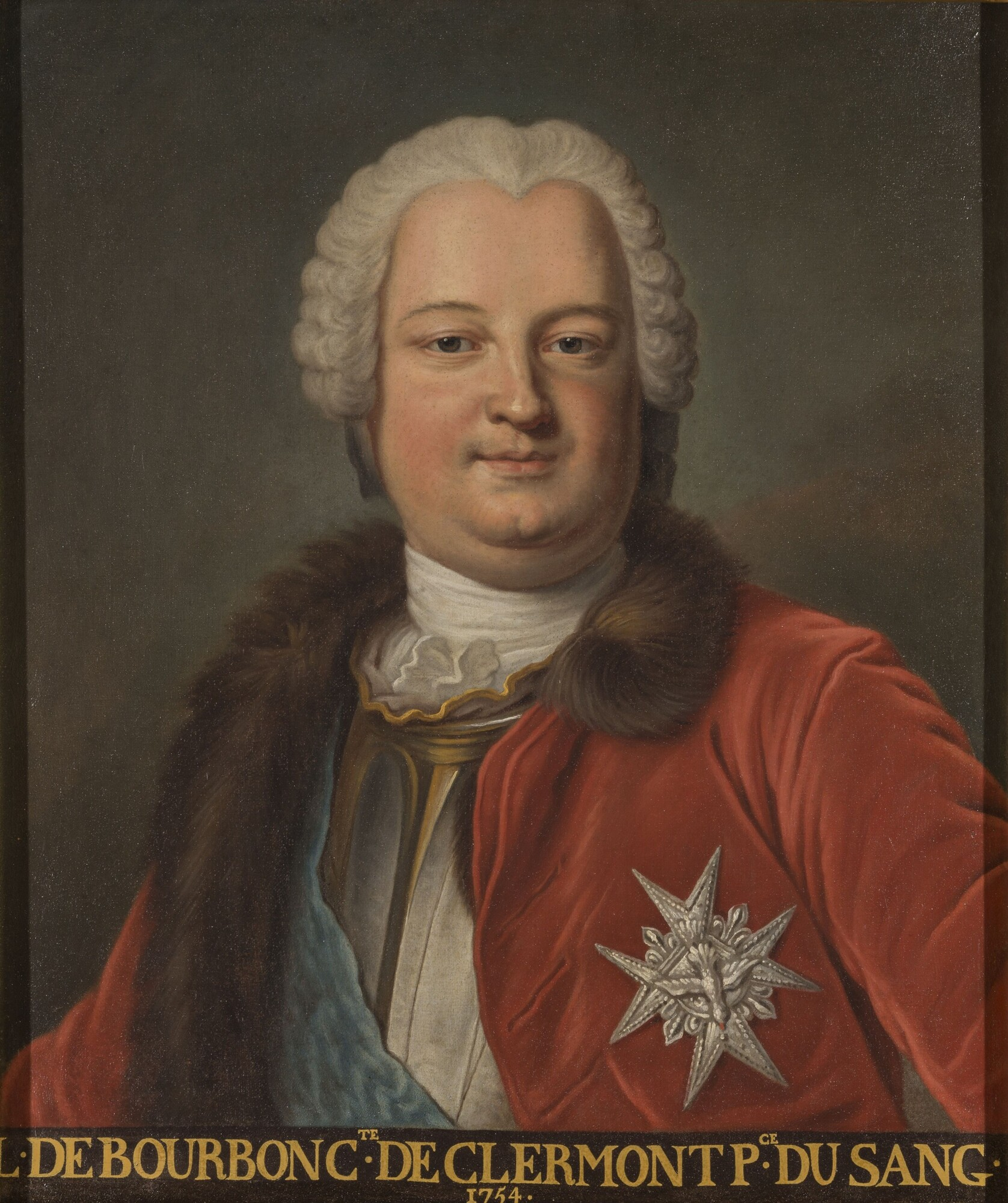
Portrait of the Comte de Clermont

The Comte de Clermont is perhaps best known to history as the fifth Grand Master of the Grand Lodge of France, the supreme Masonic authority in France, which existed from 1728/29 to c.1773.

According to some sources, the comte was elected and installed in that office in 1743 and retained the position until his death, and was succeeded by his cousin, Louis Philippe d'Orléans, known as the Duke of Chartres, afterwards Duke of Orléans. But another source claims he was designated Grand Master in 1744 "but soon left the organization, abandoning his title to Lacorne, his dancing master." Both the Cousin biography and the Académie française biography omit all reference to his Masonic activities.

On 16 June 1771, Louis died at the age of 62, in Paris, France.

== Ancestry ==
Ancestors of Louis, Count of Clermont

16. Henri II, Prince of Condé
8. Louis II, Prince of Condé
17. Charlotte Marguerite de Montmorency
4. Henri Jules, Prince of Condé
18. Urbain de Maillé, marquis de Brézé
9. Claire-Clémence de Maillé-Brézé
19. Nicole du Plessis de Richelieu
2. Louis III, Prince of Condé
20. Frederick V, Elector Palatine
10. Edward, Count Palatine of Simmern
21. Elizabeth Stuart
5. Anne Henriette of Bavaria
22. Charles I Gonzaga, Duke of Mantua
11. Anne Gonzaga
23. Catherine of Mayenne
1. Louis de Bourbon
24. Henry IV of France
12. Louis XIII of France
25. Marie de' Medici
6. Louis XIV of France
26. Philip III of Spain
13. Anne of Austria
27. Margaret of Austria
3. Louise Françoise de Bourbon
28. Gaspard de Rochechouart, marquis de Mortemart
14. Gabriel de Rochechouart, 1st Duke of Mortemart
29. Louise de Maure, comtesse de Maure
7. Madame de Montespan
30. Jean de Grandseigne, marquis de Marsillac
15. Diane de Grandseigne
31. Catherine de La Béraudière, dame de Villenon
