= Jean-Baptiste Luton Durival =

French historian, diplomat and Encyclopédiste (1725–1810)

- Born: 4 July 1725; Saint-Aubin-sur-Aire
- Died: 14 February 1810 (aged 84); Heillecourt
- Occupations: Historian; Diplomat; Encyclopédiste
- Spouse: Louise Élisabeth Dufrène (1738–1819)

Jean-Baptiste Luton Durival (4 July 1725 – 14 February 1810) was an 18th-century French historian, diplomat and Encyclopédiste.

== Life ==
His father was Jacques Durival, Officier de la garde robe de Son Altesse royale (S.A.R.), married since 29 October 1712 to Anne Humblot, his mother. Overall, the family consisted of three sons, Nicolas-Luton Durival the elder one, then Jean-Baptiste Luton and Claude Durival (1728–1805) and two daughters Catherine and Marie Anne Durival.

While his elder brother was secrétaire des conseils d’État et des finances under Stanisław Leszczyński, Jean-Baptiste took the post of first secretary of Foreign Affairs, premier secrétaire des affaires étrangères, under the Duke Étienne-François de Choiseul and led a diplomatic career.

In 1777, he was summoned to the Dutch Republic as Minister of France. He was married to Louise Élisabeth Dufrène (1738–1819).

Luton-Durival wrote several articles related to the Art militaire for the Encyclopédie. He was a member of the Académie de Stanislas.

== Works (selection) ==
- Essai sur l’Infanterie française. (1760)
- Détails militaires. (1758)
- Le Point d’honneur
- Histoire du règne de Philippe, translated with Mirabeau from Watson. Amsterdam, (1777)
- Description de la Lorraine et du Barrois.
- Recueil des observations météorologiques.
