= County of Clermont-en-Argonne =

Feudal domain in the Holy Roman Empire

Coordinates: 49.10°N 5.07°E

The County of Clermont-en-Argonne was a feudal domain in the Holy Roman Empire during the Middle Ages and in the Kingdom of France during the early modern period. It was centred on the fortified hilltop town of Clermont-en-Argonne in the diocese of Verdun. The term Clermontois can refer both to the region around Clermont and to the people of the town and region.

== Middle Ages ==
Clermont-en-Argonne with its dependencies (that is, the surrounding countryside) was given to the bishop of Verdun in 719 by Charles Martel, duke of the Franks. The county of Clermont-en-Argonne originated in the middle of the tenth century as a benefice for the advocatus (lay defender) of the diocese of Verdun.

In 1094, Clermont-en-Argonne was seized by a certain Odo and then recaptured by the bishop, Richer. In 1110, the count, Dudo, was accused of having "insulted" the bishop and was besieged in Clermont by the Emperor Henry V. Thereafter, throughout the twelfth century, the town was disputed between the bishops and the counts of Bar, several times being besieged and even burnt. After the counts gained the military advantage, they agreed to do homage to the bishop in return for Clermont. Once in legal possession of the town, the counts of Bar built strong fortifications. In the thirteenth century, Count Henry II built a fortress on the Plateau de Sainte-Anne outside Clermont. The inhabitants of the fortified plateau were enfranchised by Count Theobald II in 1246 and those of the town itself by Duke Henry IV in 1339, the counts of Bar having by then been raised to the status of dukes. In 1354, Henry IV's widow, the Countess Yolande, ruling on behalf of her young son Robert, established a mint at Clermont-en-Argonne. After 1431, the counts of Bar were also Dukes of Lorraine.

== Modern period ==
By the Treaty of Toledo in 1539, the French recognised the county of Clermont-en-Argonne as a fief of the bishop of Verdun and an arrière-fief of the Holy Roman Empire. Its customary law (coutume) was first written down in 1571. The county of Clermont-en-Argonne formed one of the bailliages of the Duchy of Lorraine. On 26 June 1632, by the Treaty of Liverdun, Duke Charles IV of Lorraine ceded the bailliage to France after the latter had invaded Lorraine as part of the Thirty Years' War. By the Treaty of Charmes of 1633, Clermont was restored to Charles IV, who, in 1635, gave it to his younger brother, Nicolas François, to serve as a dower for his wife, Claude. On 29 March 1641, by the Treaty of Paris, Charles ceded the entire Duchy of Bar, including Clermont, to the French king, Louis XIII. The cession of Clermont, Bar and the three prévôtés of Stenay, Dun, and Jametz to France was confirmed in the Treaty of the Pyrenees (1659). Although this treaty was between Spain and France, the Duke of Lorraine was a Spanish prisoner at the time and was bound to accept its terms as a condition of his release.

In 1648, Louis XIII granted the county of Clermont-en-Argonne to Louis, le Grand Condé, and it remained as an appanage in his family until the abolition of feudalism in France during the French Revolution (1790). Although Charles IV recovered the Duchy of Bar and other lands by the Treaty of Vincennes in 1661, Clermont remained with the Condé.

In 1652, Sébastien Le Prestre de Vauban oversaw the fortification of Clermont. In 1654, Clermont took the side of the rebels during the Fronde and Vauban led royal troops in besieging it. On 8 November, the Marquis de Riberpray led an assault that took the fortress and the church. The town itself held out until 22 November, when it surrendered after a siege of one month. The town was destroyed and the peasants were forced to dismantle the fortress.

From 1709 until 1771, Louis of a cadet branch of the Condés was the count of Clermont. In 1790, the land of the county of Clermont was formally attached to the national domain.

== See also ==
- Feudalism in the Holy Roman Empire

== Sources ==
- Anonymous (1919). The Americans in the Great War, Vol. III: Meuse-Argonne Battle (Montfaucon, Romagne, St-Menehould). Illustrated Michelin Guides to the Battle-Fields (1914–1918). Clermont-Ferrand: Michelin & Cie.
- Des Robert, Ferdinand (1883). Campagnes de Charles IV, duc de Lorraine et de Bar, en Allemagne, en Lorraine et en Franche-Comté (1634–1638). Paris: H. Champion.
- Goldsmith, James Lowth (2003). Lordship in France, 500–1500. Peter Lang.
- Liénard, Félix (1871). Dictionnaire topographique du Département de la Meuse. Paris: Imprimerie Nationale.
- Masson, Jean-Louis (1982). Histoire administrative de la Lorraine: des provinces aux départements et à la région. Paris: Fernand Lanore.
- Monter, William (2007). A Bewitched Duchy: Lorraine and Its Dukes, 1477–1736. Paris: Librairie Droz.
