= Nicolas Luton Durival =

French civil servant and historian (1713–1795)

Nicolas-Luton Durival (13 November 1713, in Commercy – 21 December 1795, in Heillecourt) was a Lorrain civil servant, historian and geographer who became French after 1766.

== Biography ==
The elder son of Jean-Baptiste Luton Durival, Nicolas Durival spent his entire career in the Lorraine administration. Having a good education, he was placed in the offices of the Intendance of the Duchy of Lorraine, and applied himself fully to acquire the knowledge necessary to an administrator. Struck with the imperfection of the works that existed on the topography of Lorraine, he formed the project to write one that would depart from the drought classifications and the prolixity of particular stories, contain accurate records on cities, towns and villages of this country. He published various essays to better understand if the project would be enjoyed and to request help from enlightened people; he finally brought out, after twenty years of work and research, a Description de la Lorraine et du Barrois which was regarded, rightly, as a model of this kind of works. He was then clerk of Stanislas Leszczynski's State Council, and finally lieutenant de police in Nancy.

Durival was a member of the Académie de Nancy since 1760 and communicated to the company a lot of memories on objects of public utility. His police lieutenant position having been abolished in 1790, he was appointed city manager. Though he had occupied gainful employment for most of his life, he remained poor and was included in the number of scholars to which the Convention granted relief in 1795.

Durival collaborated with the Encyclopédie by Diderot. He is the author of several books on the history, customs, agriculture, geography and customs of Lorraine.

== Publications ==
- 1753: Mémoire sur la Lorraine et le Barrois, suivi de la Table alphabétique..., etc., Nancy, in-4°. The previous year, Durival had a small number of copies printed for distribution to friends. Henriquez inserted the complete alphabetical table in his Abrégé chronologique de l’Histoire de Lorraine, of which it forms the second volume, without naming the author.
- 1748: Table alphabétique des villes, bourgs, villages et hameaux de la Lorraine et du Barrois, Nancy, in- 8°. This table was reprinted the following year, with additions, and a third time in 1766. Abbot Expilly inserted it in his Dictionnaire géographique de la France, with praises of the author.
- 1754: Coutume particulière à la Bresse, village de Lorraine, Nancy, in-8°
- 1756: Principes sur le pacage, le vain pâturage et le parcours, Nancy, in-8°; Nancy, Impr. de Ve et C. Leseure, 1766, in-8°, 7 p. (reproduction of the article Pacage of the Encyclopédie, with only a legal and customary explanation of the terms pacage, vain pâturage and parcours)
- 1763: Mémoire sur la clôture des héritages, le vain pâturage et le parcours, en Lorraine, Nancy, Thomas père et fils, in-8°, 15 p.
- 1774: Introduction à la description de la Lorraine et du Barrois, Nancy, in-8°
- 1778–1779/79–1783 Description de la Lorraine et du Barrois, Nancy, 4 vol. in-4°. The fourth volume has become rarer than the three others, the remaining copies at the bookseller having been sold to a grocer during the Revolution. We can look at this work as the result of all studies by Durival: the facts are presented methodically, the style is nice, and the many indications of scrupulous accuracy. The introduction, which is the first volume, is a complete history of Lorraine from Reinier Le long cou, first beneficiary Duke of Lorraine (959), until the death of Stanislas.

In his Bibliothèque physico-économique, Sonnini inserted three memoirs by Durival :

- Considérations sur les plantations de la Lorraine, June 1809.
- Théorie de Leopold 1er, duc de Lorraine, pour la construction et l’entretien des routes, October 1809.
- Comparaison des effets du régime actuel des chaussées avec ceux qui résultent des procédés de la théorie de Léopold 1er, November 1809.

== Sources ==
- Joseph-François Michaud, Louis-Gabriel Michaud, Biographie universelle, Paris, C. Desplaces, t. 12, 1855, p. 110.
- Justin Favier, Notice sur Nicolas Durival, Mémoires de la Société d’Archéologie lorraine, 1880, p. 5–36.
- la Lorraine au xviiie siècle.
