= Ville-devant-Belrain =

- Commune
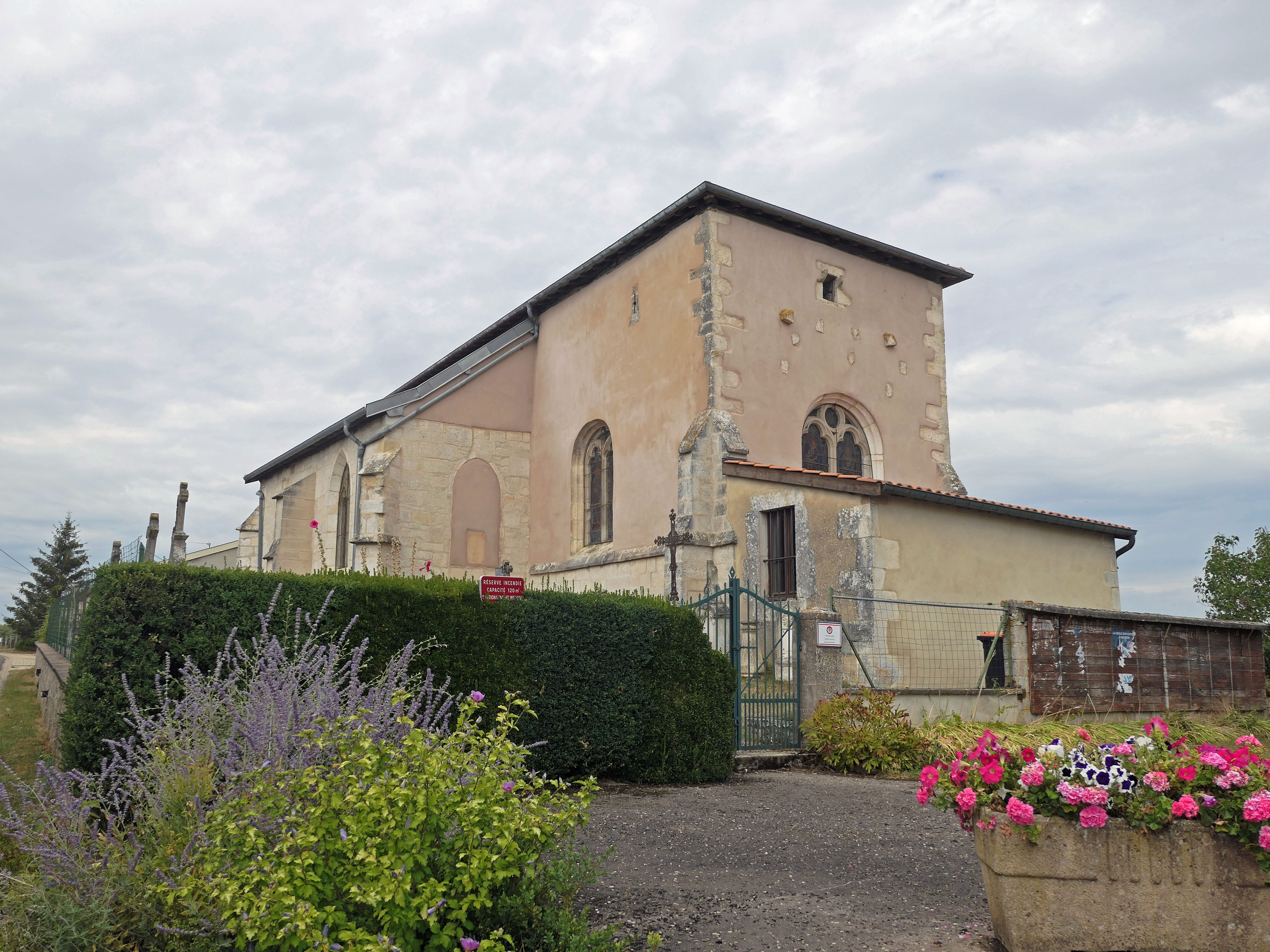

- Coat of arms
- Location of Ville-devant-Belrain
- Location within France Location within Grand Est
- Coordinates: 48°52′15″N 5°20′20″E
- Country: France
- Region: Grand Est
- Department: Meuse
- Arrondissement: Commercy
- Canton: Dieue-sur-Meuse
- Intercommunality: CC de l'Aire à l'Argonne

Government
  - Mayor (2020–2026): Philippe Brissé
- Area^{1}: 6.12 km^{2} (2.36 sq mi)
- Elevation: 330 m (1,080 ft)
- Highest elevation: 331 m (1,086 ft)
- Lowest elevation: 252 m (827 ft)
- Population (2023): 33
  - Density: 5.4/km^{2} (14/sq mi)
- Time zone: UTC+01:00 (CET)
  - Summer (DST): UTC+02:00 (CEST)
- INSEE/Postal code: 55555 /55260
- ^{1} French Land Register data, which excludes lakes, ponds, glaciers > 1 km^{2} (0.386 sq mi or 247 acres) and river estuaries.

Ville-devant-Belrain (French pronunciation: [vil dəvɑ̃ bɛlʁɛ̃], literally Ville before Belrain) is a commune in the Meuse department in Grand Est in north-eastern France.

== See also ==
- Communes of the Meuse department
