= Autrécourt-sur-Aire =

- Commune
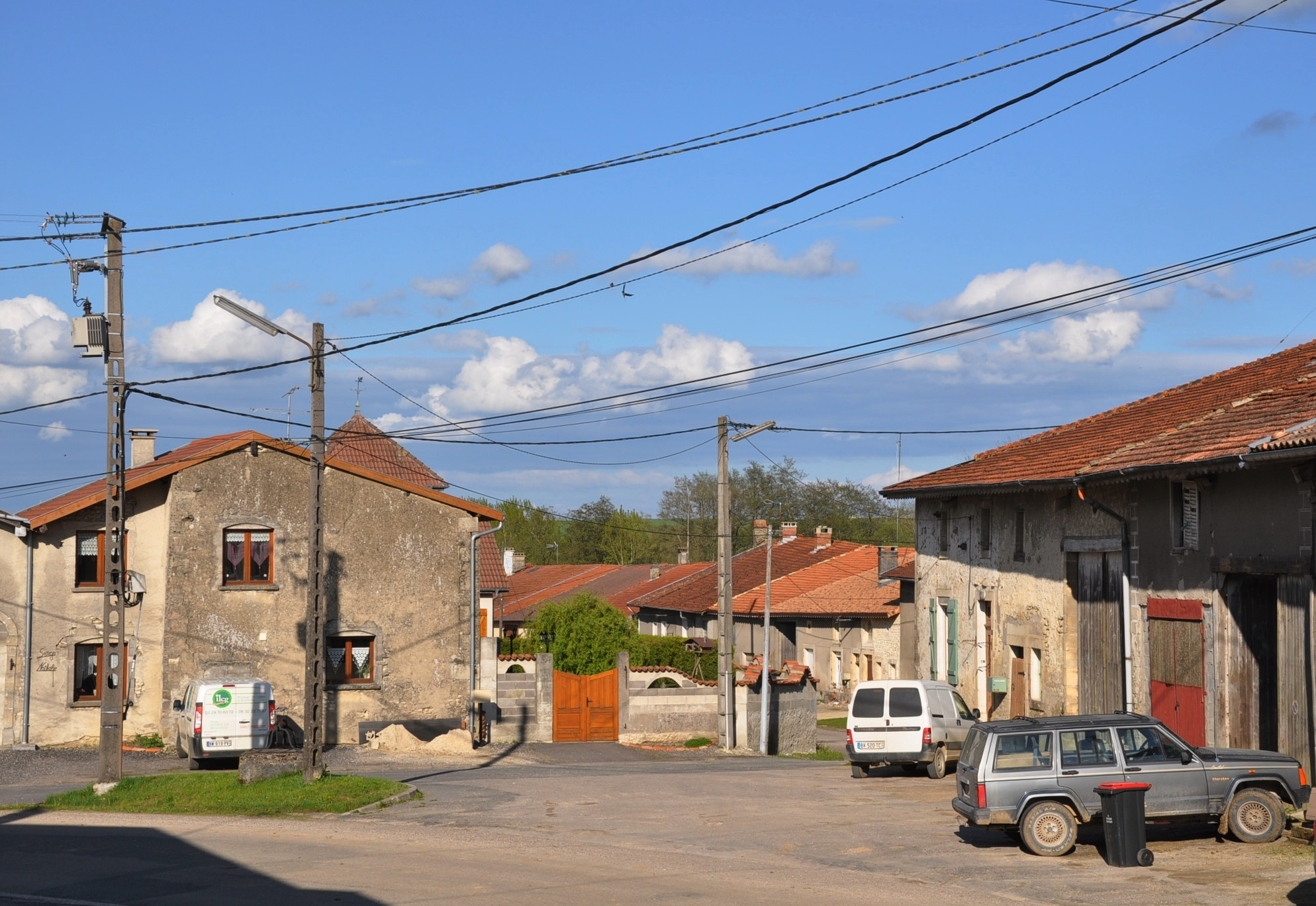
- A general view of Autrécourt-sur-Aire

- Coat of arms
- Location of Autrécourt-sur-Aire
- Location within France Location within Grand Est
- Coordinates: 49°02′09″N 5°08′20″E
- Country: France
- Region: Grand Est
- Department: Meuse
- Arrondissement: Bar-le-Duc
- Canton: Dieue-sur-Meuse
- Intercommunality: CC Aire Argonne

Government
  - Mayor (2020–2026): Thierry Migot
- Area^{1}: 10.85 km^{2} (4.19 sq mi)
- Elevation: 205 m (673 ft)
- Highest elevation: 281 m (922 ft)
- Lowest elevation: 202 m (663 ft)
- Population (2023): 109
  - Density: 10.0/km^{2} (26.0/sq mi)
- Time zone: UTC+01:00 (CET)
  - Summer (DST): UTC+02:00 (CEST)
- INSEE/Postal code: 55017 /55120
- ^{1} French Land Register data, which excludes lakes, ponds, glaciers > 1 km^{2} (0.386 sq mi or 247 acres) and river estuaries.

Autrécourt-sur-Aire (French pronunciation: [otʁekuʁ syʁ ɛːʁ]; literally "Autrécourt on Aire") is a commune in the Meuse department in the Grand Est region in northeastern France.

Autrécourt-sur-Aire is the only village in this commune. The nearest town is Verdun, 27.4 km to the northeast.

== Population ==
Historical population
Year	Pop.	±% p.a.
1968	146	—
1975	105	−4.60%
1982	96	−1.27%
1990	105	+1.13%
1999	110	+0.52%
2007	134	+2.50%
2012	116	−2.84%
2017	115	−0.17%
2023	109	−0.89%
Source: INSEE

== Gallery ==
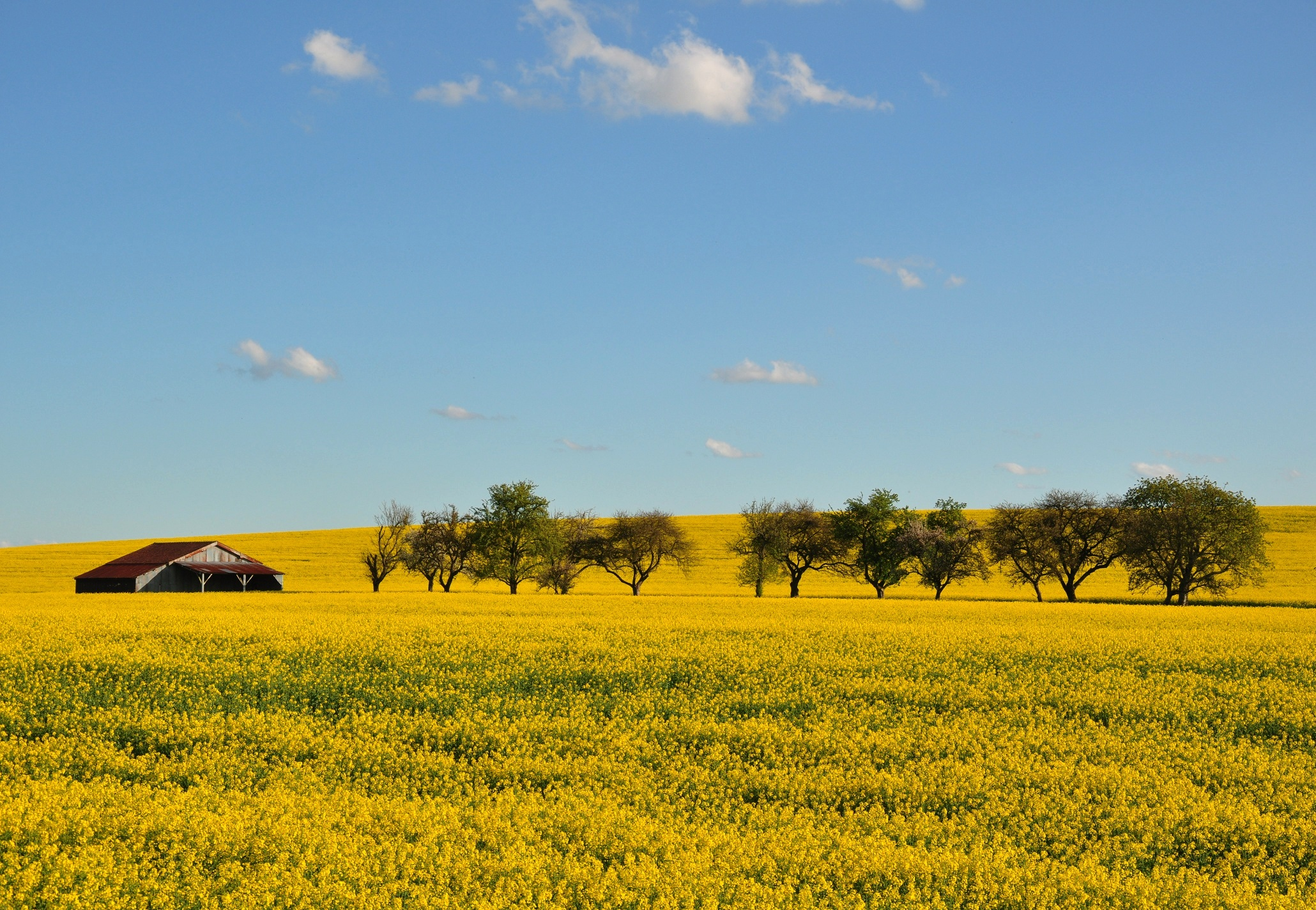
Spring in Autrécourt-sur-Aire

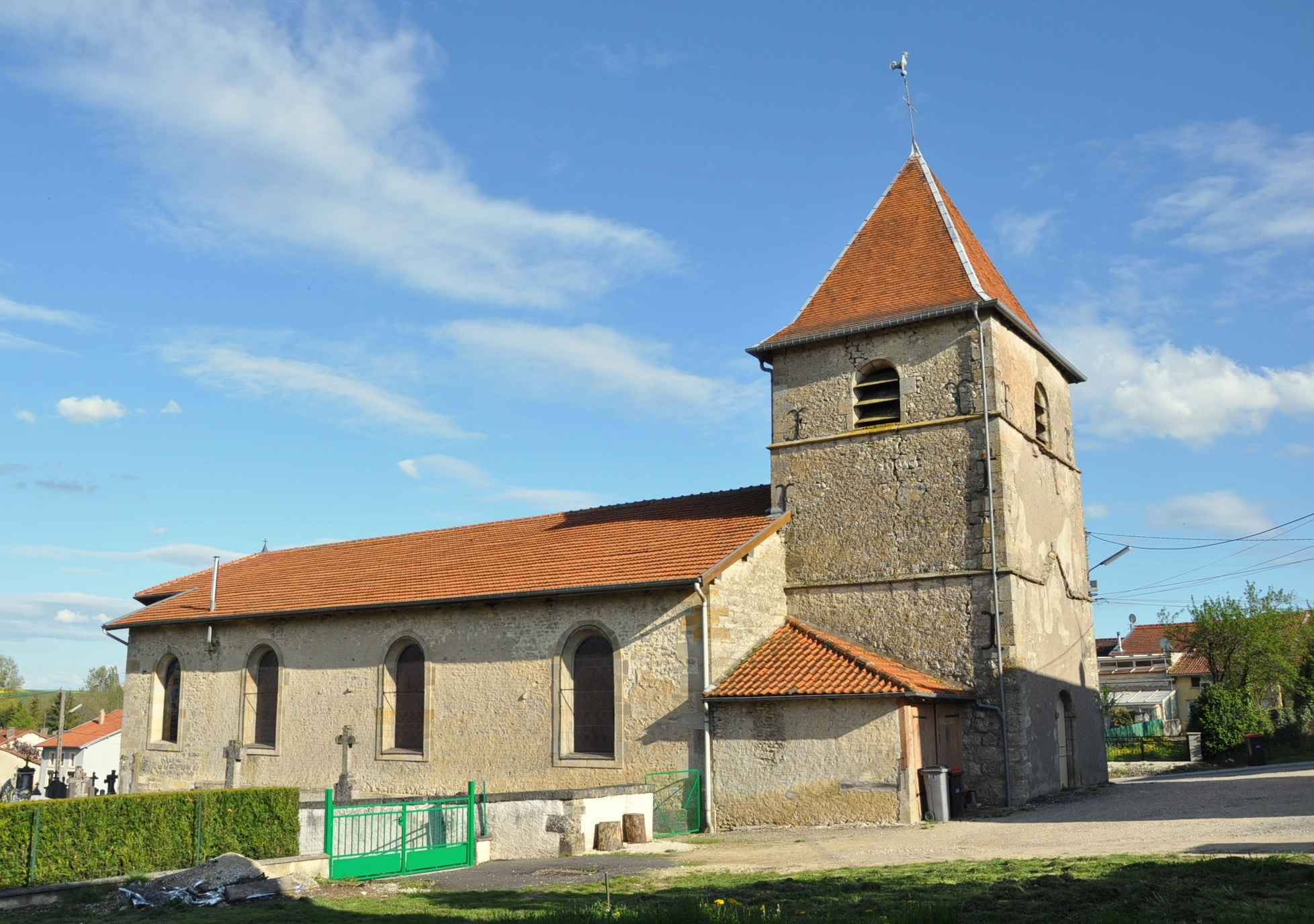
Church of St. Avitus

== See also ==
- Communes of the Meuse department
