= Aire (Aisne) =

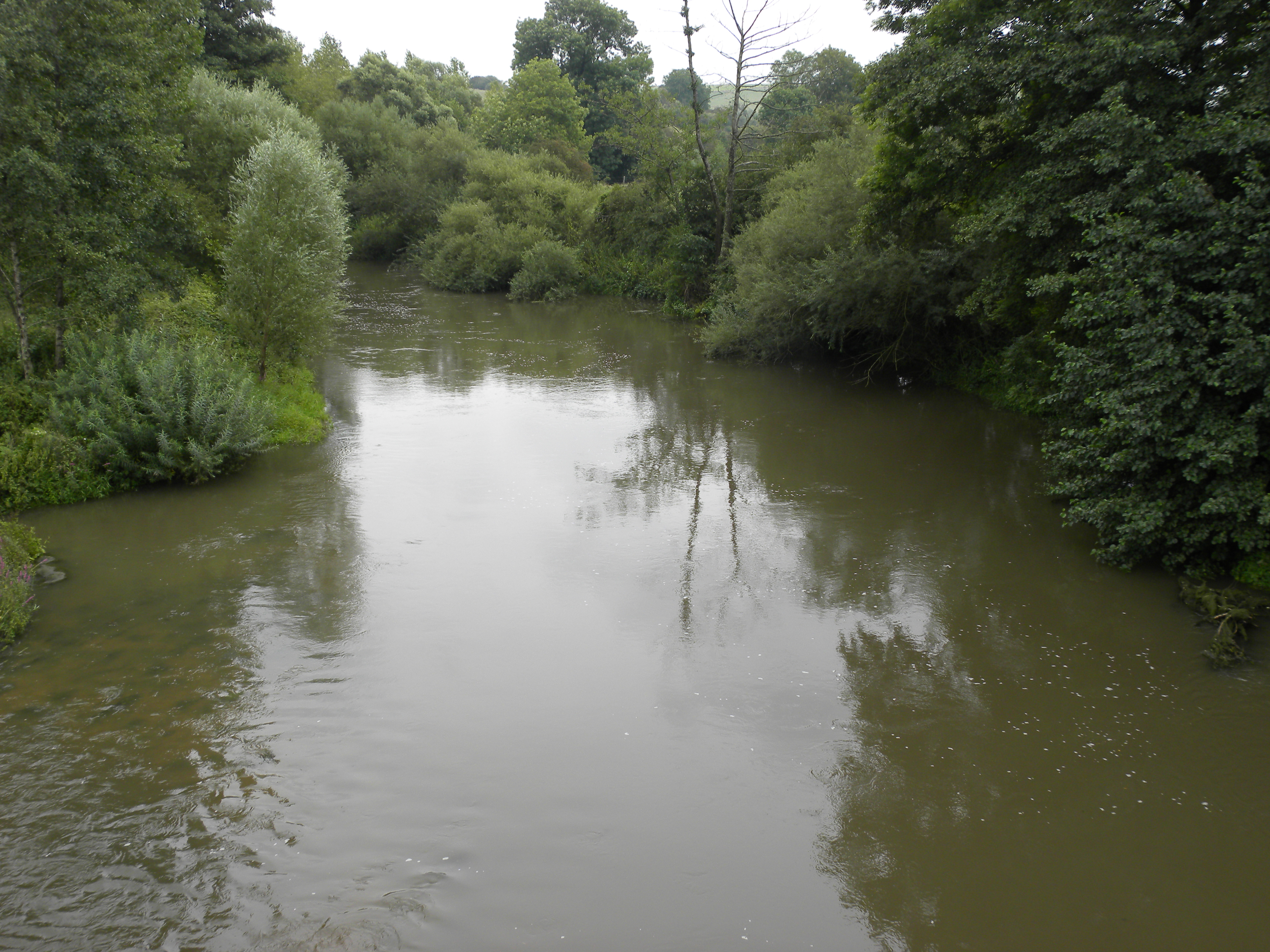
- Aire River at Apremont, France

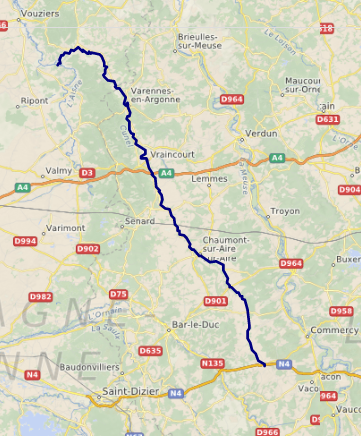

Location
- Country: France

Physical characteristics
- Source
  - location: French Ardennes
- Mouth
  - location: Aisne
  - coordinates: 49°18′28″N 4°49′17″E
- Length: 125 km (78 mi)
- Basin size: 1,043 km^{2} (403 sq mi)
- Discharge
  - average: 13 m^{3}/s (460 cu ft/s)

Basin features
- Progression: Aisne→ Oise→ Seine→ English Channel

The Aire (French pronunciation: [ɛːʁ]) is a river of northern France, crossing the departments of Meuse and Ardennes. It is a right tributary of the Aisne. It is 124.8 km (77.5 mi) long. Its source is near Saint-Aubin-sur-Aire in Meuse. It flows through the towns of Pierrefitte-sur-Aire, Clermont-en-Argonne, Varennes-en-Argonne and Grandpré, finally flowing into the Aisne in Termes.
