= Contrisson =

- Commune
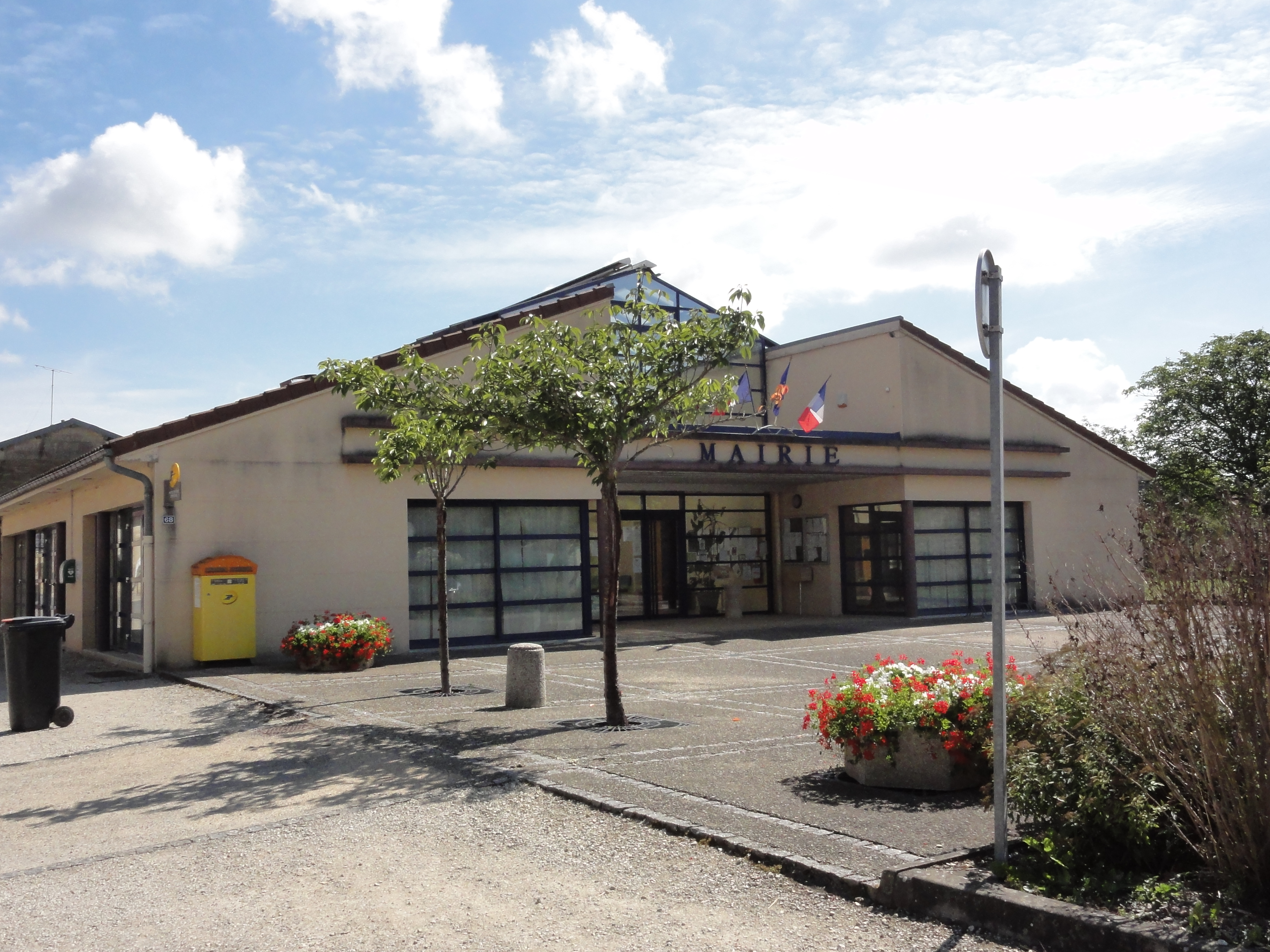
- The town hall in Contrisson

- Coat of arms
- Location of Contrisson
- Location within France Location within Grand Est
- Coordinates: 48°48′12″N 4°57′23″E
- Country: France
- Region: Grand Est
- Department: Meuse
- Arrondissement: Bar-le-Duc
- Canton: Revigny-sur-Ornain
- Intercommunality: CC du Pays de Revigny-sur-Ornain

Government
  - Mayor (2020–2026): François Clausse
- Area^{1}: 11.82 km^{2} (4.56 sq mi)
- Elevation: 150 m (490 ft)
- Highest elevation: 181 m (594 ft)
- Lowest elevation: 130 m (430 ft)
- Population (2023): 764
  - Density: 64.6/km^{2} (167/sq mi)
- Time zone: UTC+01:00 (CET)
  - Summer (DST): UTC+02:00 (CEST)
- INSEE/Postal code: 55125 /55800
- ^{1} French Land Register data, which excludes lakes, ponds, glaciers > 1 km^{2} (0.386 sq mi or 247 acres) and river estuaries.

Contrisson (French pronunciation: [kɔ̃tʁisɔ̃]) is a commune in the Meuse department in Grand Est in north-eastern France.

== See also ==
- Communes of the Meuse department
- ''Contrisson, images au fil du temps", by Emmanuel Ahounou-Thiriot and Agnès Thiriot, Les Dossiers d'Aquitaine, Bordeaux, 293 p., 2012.
