= Nixéville-Blercourt =

- Commune
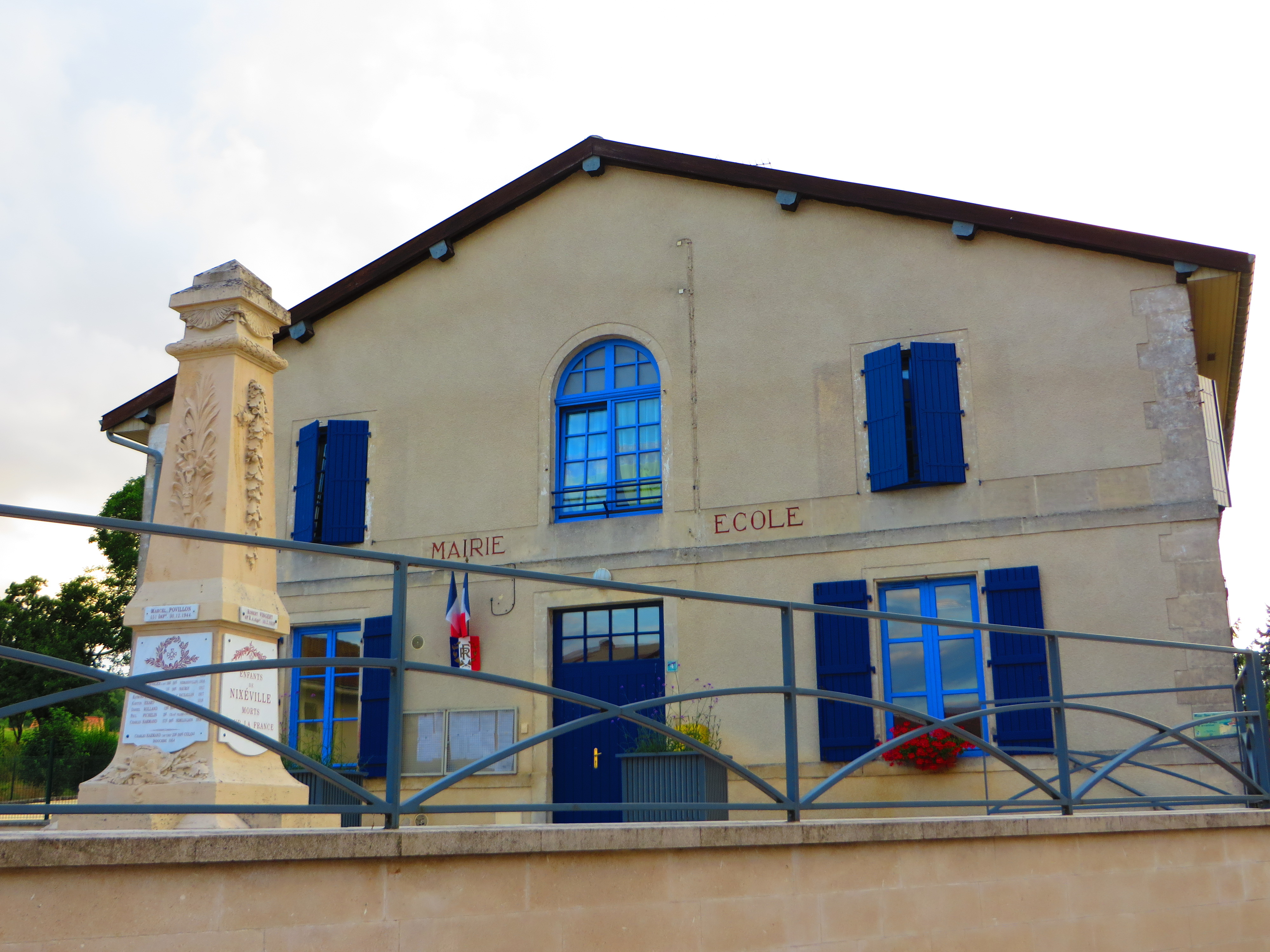
- The town hall in Nixéville-Blercourt
- Location of Nixéville-Blercourt
- Location within France Location within Grand Est
- Coordinates: 49°06′38″N 5°16′32″E
- Country: France
- Region: Grand Est
- Department: Meuse
- Arrondissement: Verdun
- Canton: Dieue-sur-Meuse
- Intercommunality: Val de Meuse - Voie Sacrée

Government
  - Mayor (2020–2026): Jean-Noël Postal
- Area^{1}: 19.54 km^{2} (7.54 sq mi)
- Elevation: 271 m (889 ft)
- Highest elevation: 347 m (1,138 ft)
- Lowest elevation: 220 m (720 ft)
- Population (2023): 506
  - Density: 25.9/km^{2} (67.1/sq mi)
- Time zone: UTC+01:00 (CET)
  - Summer (DST): UTC+02:00 (CEST)
- INSEE/Postal code: 55385 /55120
- ^{1} French Land Register data, which excludes lakes, ponds, glaciers > 1 km^{2} (0.386 sq mi or 247 acres) and river estuaries.

Nixéville-Blercourt is a commune in the Meuse department in Grand Est in north-eastern France.

== See also ==
- Communes of the Meuse department
