= Réseau de la Woëvre =

Coordinates: 49.21127°N 5.47467°E

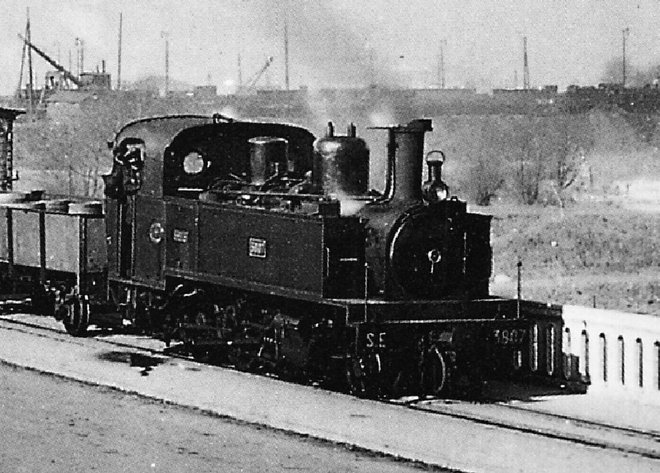
- SE N°3807 (Decauville N° 668/1913) after World War I

Technical
- Line length: 149 km (93 mi)
- Track gauge: 1,000 mm (3 ft 3 3/8 in)
Route map
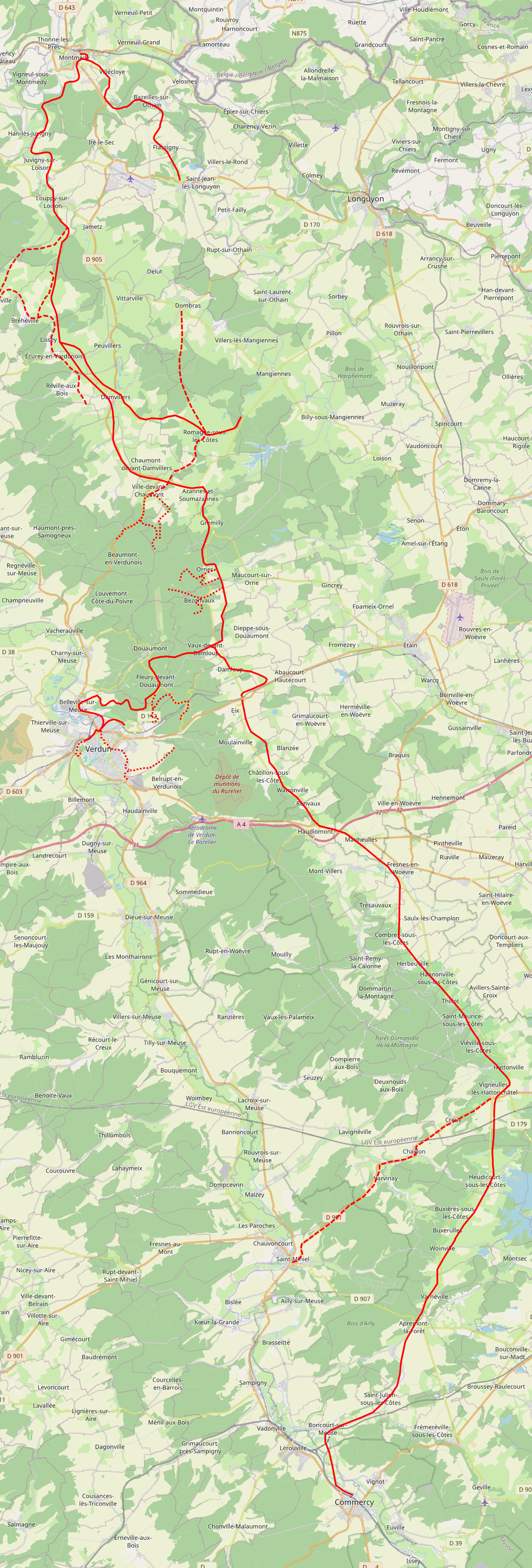
Former route superimposed onto a modern map
Metre gauge railway (lines), narrow gauge railways
(broken lines) and trench railways (dotted lines)

The Réseau de la Woëvre was a 149 km (93 mi) long metre-gauge rail network that operated from 1914 to 1938 in France. A 66 km (41 mi) branch line to Commercy branched off from the 61 km Verdun-Montmédy main line at Vaux-devant-Damloup.

== History ==
The network operator of the Réseau de la Woëvre was granted a concession for non-profit operation by a law of 13 June 1907, and began operating it in 1914.

The Société Générale des Chemins de Fer Économiques (SE) took over the operation in 1922. The company had opened its own network in 1914, shortly before the start of the First World War.

== Route ==
The Réseau de la Woëvre, with a gauge of 1,000 mm (3 ft 3 3/8 in), was a railway network built in the department of Meuse and operated between 1914 and 1938 by the Société Générale des Chemins de Fer Économiques (SE). It comprised a series of lines with a total length of 149 km (93 mi).

There were four sections:

- Metre gauge
  - Verdun - Vaux-devant-Damloup - Montmédy (61 km), opened in 1914, closed in 1938
  - Vaux-devant-Damloup - Commercy (66 km), opened 1914, closed 1938
- Standard gauge
  - Robert-Espagne - Haironville (11 km), opened 1933, closed 1971
  - Aubréville - Varenne-en-Argonne (11 km), opened in 1918, closed in 1937

== Stations and bridges ==
Stations and bridges	Photos	Condition
Montmédy-Ville		preserved
Louppy-Remoiville		
Brandeville		
Bréhéville		
Lissey		
Damvillers		
Moirey-Flabas		
Azannes		
Vaux-devant-Damloup		
Fleury-devant-Douaumont		
Meuse, Pont de la Galavaude		
Verdun		
Stations and bridges	Photos	Condition
Vaux-devant-Damloup		
Eix-Abaucourt		
Manheulles		preserved
Fresnes-en-Woëvre		
Combres		preserved
Thillot		preserved
Vigneulles-lès-Hattonchâtel		preserved
Buxières		
Boncourt-sur-Meuse		
Canal de l'Est		
Commercy		
