= Sorcy-Saint-Martin =

- Commune
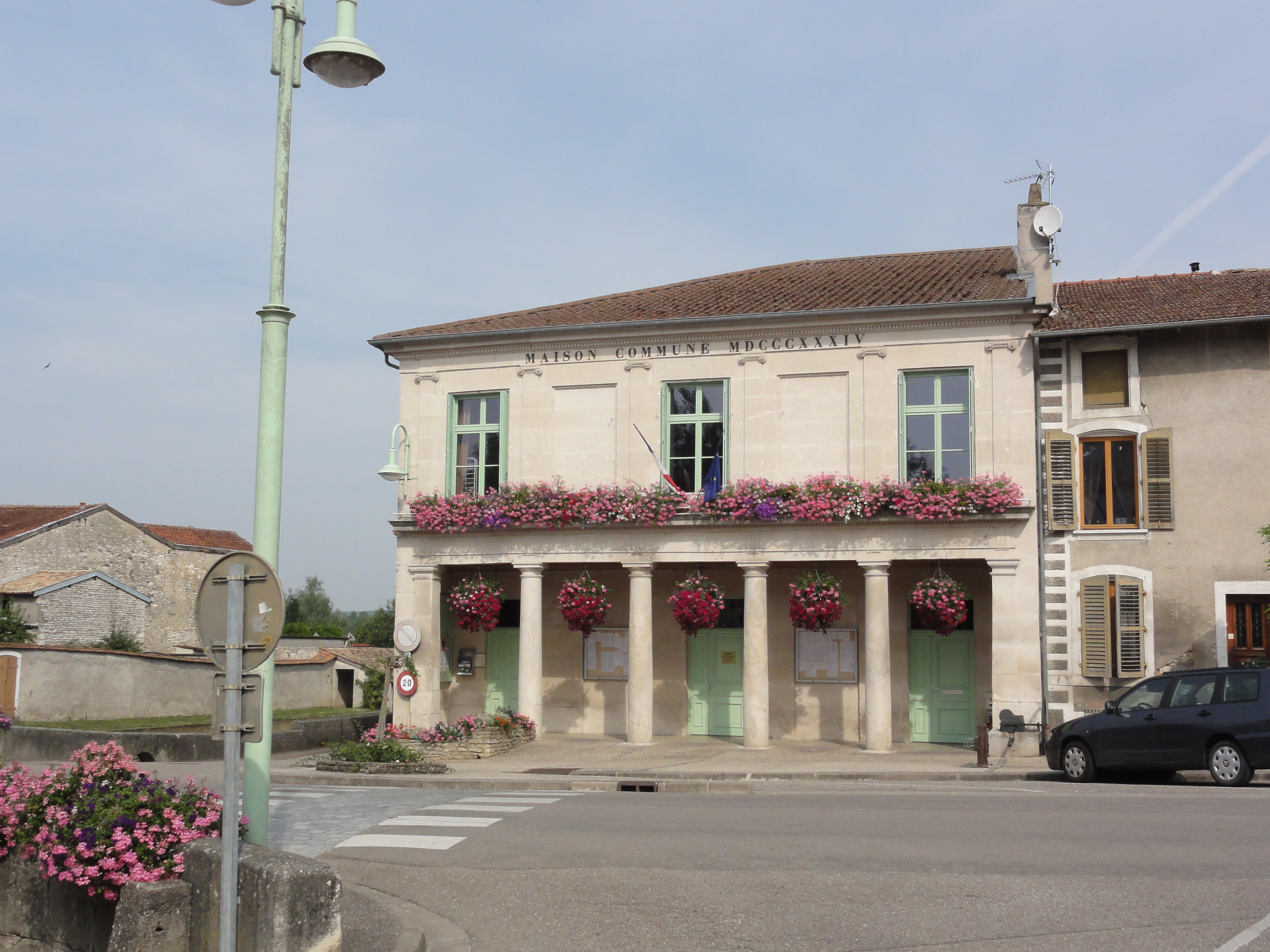
- The town hall in Sorcy-Saint-Martin

- Coat of arms
- Location of Sorcy-Saint-Martin
- Location within France Location within Grand Est
- Coordinates: 48°42′45″N 5°38′03″E
- Country: France
- Region: Grand Est
- Department: Meuse
- Arrondissement: Commercy
- Canton: Vaucouleurs

Government
  - Mayor (2020–2026): Franck Martin
- Area^{1}: 21.72 km^{2} (8.39 sq mi)
- Elevation: 241 m (791 ft)
- Highest elevation: 364 m (1,194 ft)
- Lowest elevation: 231 m (758 ft)
- Population (2023): 1,046
  - Density: 48.16/km^{2} (124.7/sq mi)
- Time zone: UTC+01:00 (CET)
  - Summer (DST): UTC+02:00 (CEST)
- INSEE/Postal code: 55496 /55190
- ^{1} French Land Register data, which excludes lakes, ponds, glaciers > 1 km^{2} (0.386 sq mi or 247 acres) and river estuaries.

Sorcy-Saint-Martin (French pronunciation: [sɔʁsi sɛ̃ maʁtɛ̃]) is a commune in the Meuse department in Grand Est in north-eastern France.

== See also ==
- Communes of the Meuse department
