= Haironville =

- Commune
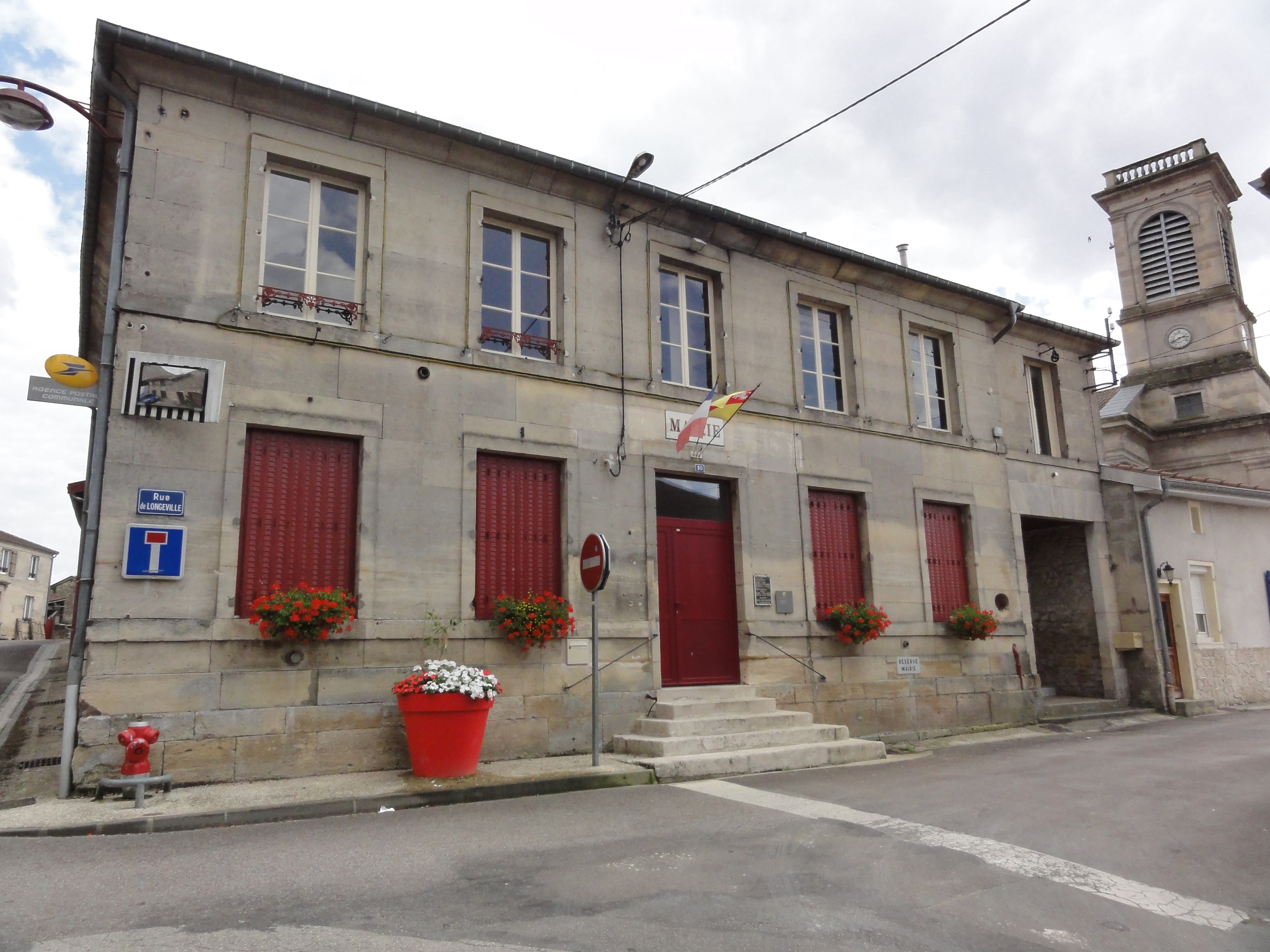
- The town hall in Haironville

- Coat of arms
- Location of Haironville
- Location within France Location within Grand Est
- Coordinates: 48°41′12″N 5°05′07″E
- Country: France
- Region: Grand Est
- Department: Meuse
- Arrondissement: Bar-le-Duc
- Canton: Ancerville
- Intercommunality: CC Portes de Meuse

Government
  - Mayor (2020–2026): André Hopfner
- Area^{1}: 9.79 km^{2} (3.78 sq mi)
- Elevation: 180 m (590 ft)
- Highest elevation: 254 m (833 ft)
- Lowest elevation: 172 m (564 ft)
- Population (2023): 566
  - Density: 57.8/km^{2} (150/sq mi)
- Time zone: UTC+01:00 (CET)
  - Summer (DST): UTC+02:00 (CEST)
- INSEE/Postal code: 55224 /55000
- ^{1} French Land Register data, which excludes lakes, ponds, glaciers > 1 km^{2} (0.386 sq mi or 247 acres) and river estuaries.

Haironville (French pronunciation: [ɛʁɔ̃vil]) is a commune in the Meuse department in Grand Est in north-eastern France.

== See also ==
- Communes of the Meuse department
