= Pierrefitte-sur-Aire =

- Commune
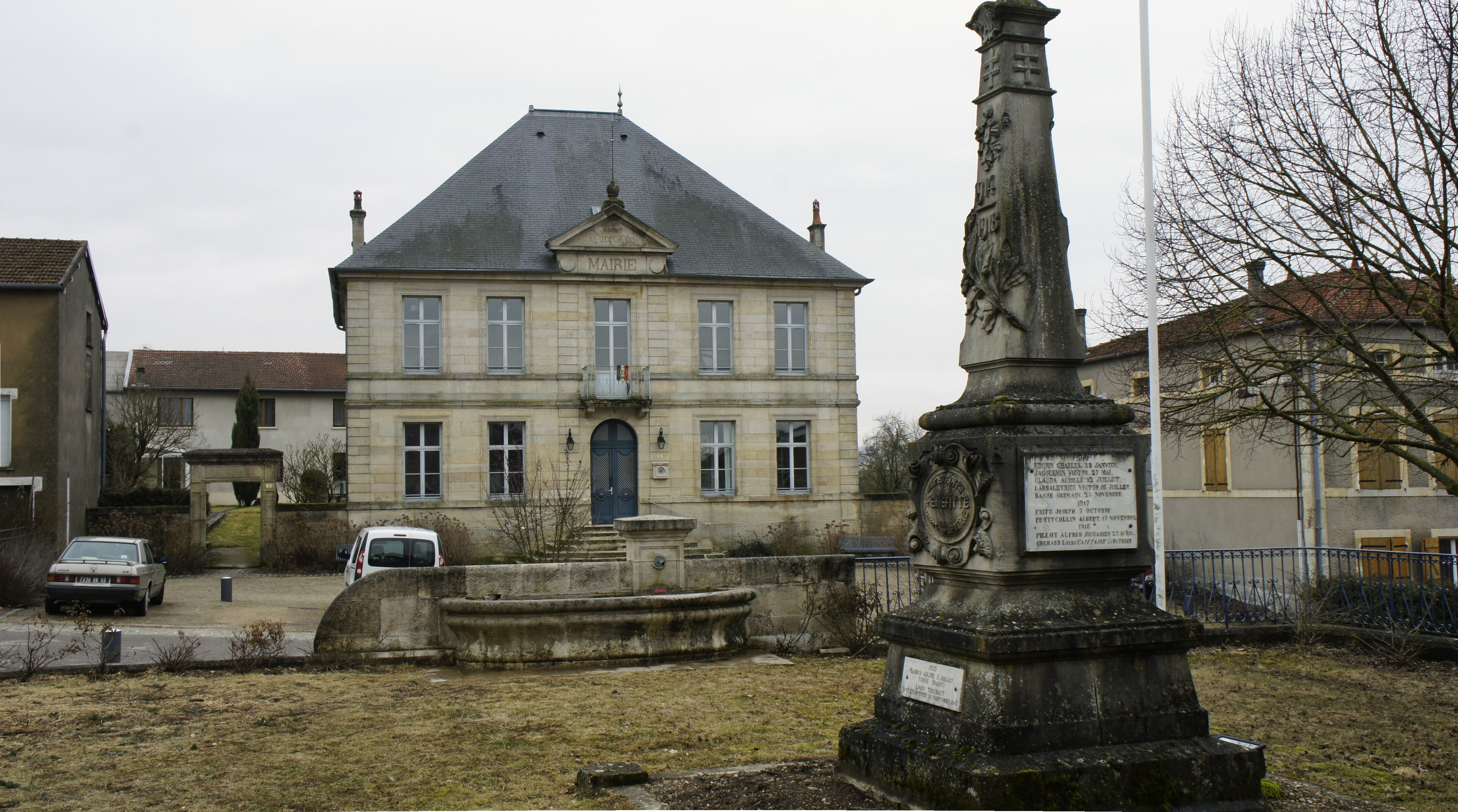
- The town hall in Pierrefitte-sur-Aire

- Coat of arms
- Location of Pierrefitte-sur-Aire
- Location within France Location within Grand Est
- Coordinates: 48°53′57″N 5°19′47″E
- Country: France
- Region: Grand Est
- Department: Meuse
- Arrondissement: Commercy
- Canton: Dieue-sur-Meuse
- Intercommunality: CC de l'Aire à l'Argonne

Government
  - Mayor (2020–2026): Robert Breneur
- Area^{1}: 17.56 km^{2} (6.78 sq mi)
- Elevation: 251 m (823 ft)
- Highest elevation: 347 m (1,138 ft)
- Lowest elevation: 247 m (810 ft)
- Population (2023): 304
  - Density: 17.3/km^{2} (44.8/sq mi)
- Time zone: UTC+01:00 (CET)
  - Summer (DST): UTC+02:00 (CEST)
- INSEE/Postal code: 55404 /55260
- ^{1} French Land Register data, which excludes lakes, ponds, glaciers > 1 km^{2} (0.386 sq mi or 247 acres) and river estuaries.

Pierrefitte-sur-Aire (French pronunciation: [pjɛʁfit syʁ ɛːʁ]; literally "Pierrefitte on Aire") is a commune in the Meuse department in Grand Est in north-eastern France.

== See also ==
- Communes of the Meuse department
