= Belrain =

- Commune
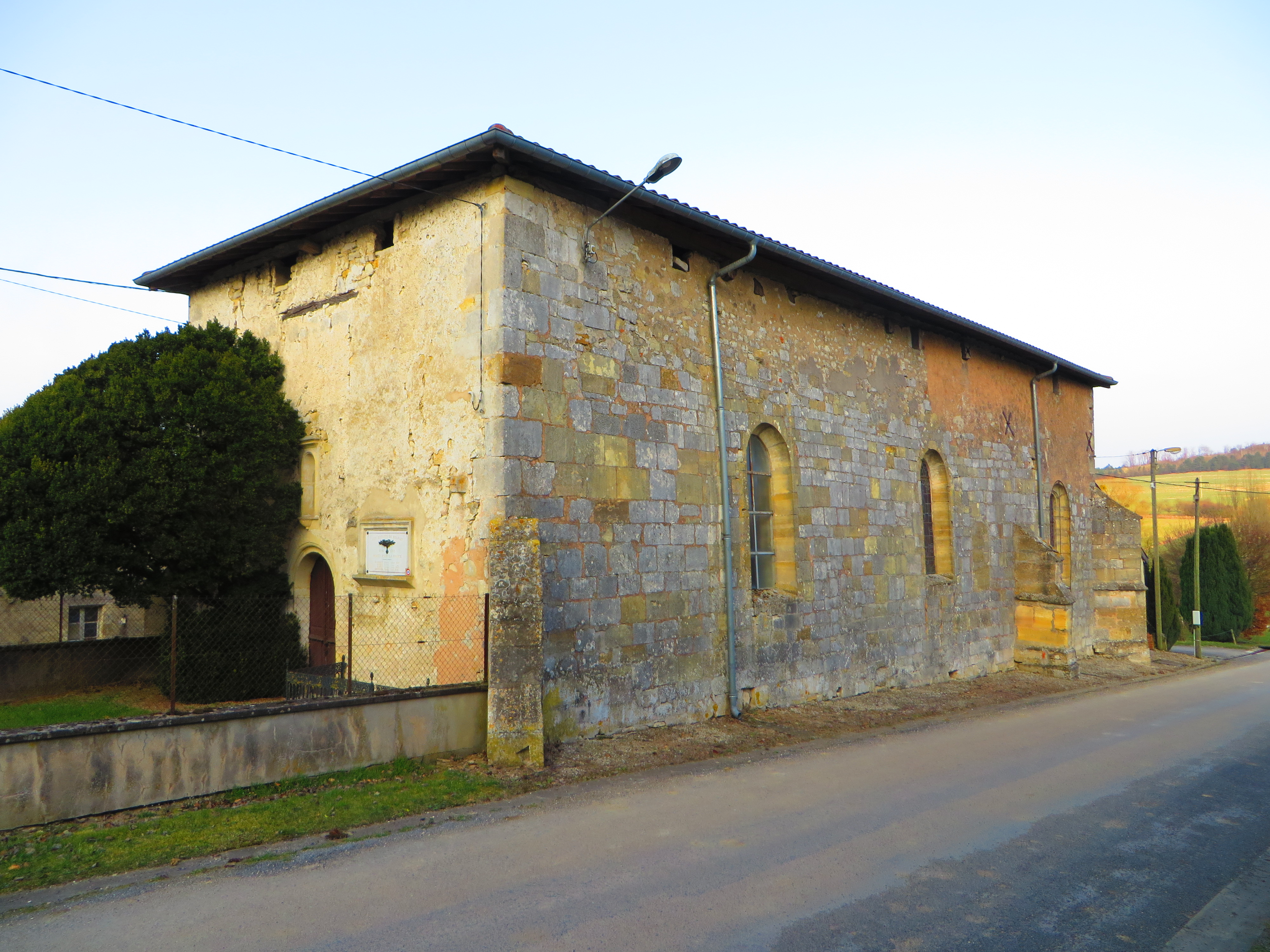
- The church in Belrain

- Coat of arms
- Location of Belrain
- Location within France Location within Grand Est
- Coordinates: 48°51′50″N 5°18′27″E
- Country: France
- Region: Grand Est
- Department: Meuse
- Arrondissement: Commercy
- Canton: Dieue-sur-Meuse

Government
  - Mayor (2020–2026): Patrick Gondouin
- Area^{1}: 8.31 km^{2} (3.21 sq mi)
- Elevation: 330 m (1,080 ft)
- Highest elevation: 352 m (1,155 ft)
- Lowest elevation: 258 m (846 ft)
- Population (2023): 41
  - Density: 4.9/km^{2} (13/sq mi)
- Time zone: UTC+01:00 (CET)
  - Summer (DST): UTC+02:00 (CEST)
- INSEE/Postal code: 55044 /55260
- ^{1} French Land Register data, which excludes lakes, ponds, glaciers > 1 km^{2} (0.386 sq mi or 247 acres) and river estuaries.

Belrain (French pronunciation: [bɛlʁɛ̃]) is a commune in the Meuse department in the Grand Est region in northeastern France. It is located approximately 35 miles (56 km) west-north-west of Toul.

== Population ==
Historical population
Year	Pop.	±% p.a.
1968	54	—
1975	44	−2.88%
1982	33	−4.03%
1990	36	+1.09%
1999	31	−1.65%
2007	46	+5.06%
2012	40	−2.76%
2017	36	−2.09%
2023	41	+2.19%
Source: INSEE

== See also ==
- Communes of the Meuse department
