= Clermont-en-Argonne =

- Commune
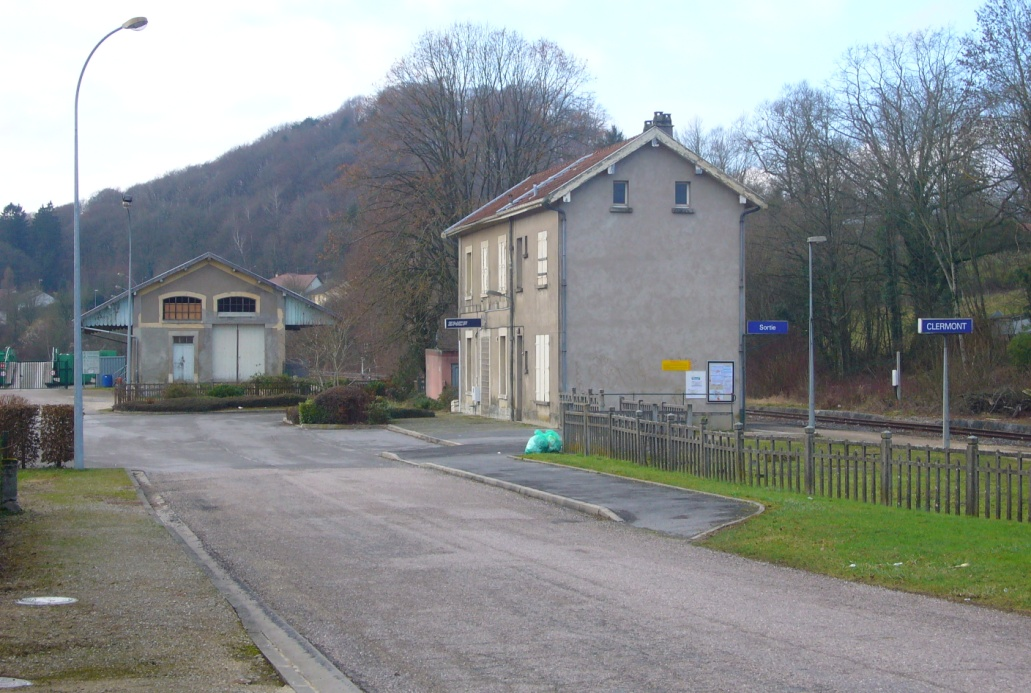
- The railway station

- Coat of arms
- Location of Clermont-en-Argonne
- Location within France Location within Grand Est
- Coordinates: 49°06′23″N 5°04′18″E
- Country: France
- Region: Grand Est
- Department: Meuse
- Arrondissement: Verdun
- Canton: Clermont-en-Argonne

Government
  - Mayor (2020–2026): Alain Chapé
- Area^{1}: 66.94 km^{2} (25.85 sq mi)
- Elevation: 295 m (968 ft)
- Highest elevation: 303 m (994 ft)
- Lowest elevation: 163 m (535 ft)
- Population (2023): 1,406
  - Density: 21.00/km^{2} (54.40/sq mi)
- Time zone: UTC+01:00 (CET)
  - Summer (DST): UTC+02:00 (CEST)
- INSEE/Postal code: 55117 /55120
- ^{1} French Land Register data, which excludes lakes, ponds, glaciers > 1 km^{2} (0.386 sq mi or 247 acres) and river estuaries.

Clermont-en-Argonne (French pronunciation: [klɛʁmɔ̃ ɑ̃.n‿aʁɡɔn], lit. 'Clermont in Argonne'; formerly Clermont-sur-Meuse, lit. 'Clermont on Meuse') is a commune in the Meuse department in Grand Est in north-eastern France.

The former towns of Auzéville-en-Argonne, Jubécourt, and Parois were joined to Clermont-en-Argonne in 1973.

== Geography ==
The town is located along the old road from Paris to Verdun (RN3), which at this point is closely tracked by the A4 autoroute, on the edge of the Forest of Argonne. It is approximately 15 km to the east of Sainte-Menehould.

Clermont's population has declined slightly in the last decades to 1,449 (in 2020), which gives a population density of 22 inhabitants per km^{2}. The mechanisation of agriculture that took place during the 20th century left this region, which remains overwhelmingly rural, short of employment opportunities: Clermont's economy has tended to suffer from the drift of working age populations to the towns and cities.

== Population ==
Historical population
| Year | Pop. | ±% p.a. |
|---|---|---|
| 1968 | 1,575 | — |
| 1975 | 1,605 | +0.27% |
| 1982 | 1,778 | +1.47% |
| 1990 | 1,794 | +0.11% |
| 1999 | 1,767 | −0.17% |
| 2007 | 1,615 | −1.12% |
| 2012 | 1,548 | −0.84% |
| 2017 | 1,480 | −0.89% |
| 2023 | 1,406 | −0.85% |
Source: INSEE

== History ==
During the Middle Ages, Clermont was the seat of the County of Clermont-en-Argonne in the Holy Roman Empire. It only became French permanently in 1641. The county was abolished in 1790.

In 1819, Norwich Duff wrote 'Clermont en Argonne is a very small town situated on the side of a hill on top of which there is a telegraph, a small church, and very extensive and fine views'.

The telegraph station was one in line of a semaphore line constructed in the Napoleonic period for the rapid transmission of messages between Paris and Landau; but by 1819 France's eastern frontiers had been much reduced, and the final point of this telegraph line was first Landau and after 1819 Strasbourg. The platform where the Clermont telegraph station stood still exists, as do fine views from it in the direction of Verdun to the east. (A line of trees blocks the former panoramic view to the west.) The telegraph line closed in 1852, the year when the rail road linking Paris to Strasbourg was opened. The Clermont telegraph station was destroyed in or before 1916, when the platform on which it had stood was used as the mounting position for a large gun.

Back in 1819 Norwich Duff also recorded that the town 'is said to have manufacturies of paper and glass, but I did not see any of them. Clermont might easily be fortified'.

At the foot of the hill, Clermont is still a small town, its centre not radically 'improved' during the 20th century. It boasts (at least) one excellent restaurant.

== See also ==
- Communes of the Meuse department
