= Alain-Fournier =

French author and soldier (1886–1914)

Henri-Alban Fournier
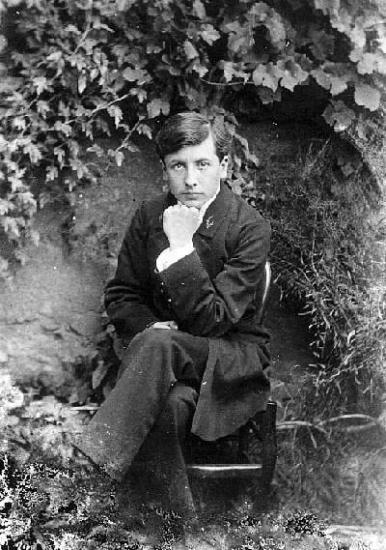
- Fournier in 1905
- Born: Henri-Alban Fournier; 3 October 1886; La Chapelle-d'Angillon, Berry, France
- Died: 22 September 1914 (aged 27) near Vaux-lès-Palameix, Lorraine, France
- Cause of death: Killed in action
- Occupations: Novelist, critic, soldier
- Writing career
- Pen name: Alain-Fournier
- Period: 1909–14
- Notable work: Le Grand Meaulnes
- Military career
- Allegiance: France
- Branch: French Army
- Service years: 1914
- Rank: Lieutenant
- Conflicts: First World War: Western Front †

Henri-Alban Fournier (French pronunciation: [ɑ̃ʁi albɑ̃ fuʁnje]; 3 October 1886 – 22 September 1914), known by the pseudonym Alain-Fournier (French: [alɛ̃ fuʁnje]), was a French author and soldier. He was the author of a novel, Le Grand Meaulnes (1913), which has been filmed twice and is considered a classic of French literature. The book is based partly on his childhood.

== Biography ==
Alain-Fournier was born in La Chapelle-d'Angillon, in the Cher département, in central France, the son of school teachers. Everyone who knew him called him "Henri", his first name or "Fournier", his last name, as "Alain-Fournier" was merely a nom-de-plume. He had a younger sister, Isabelle, to whom he was very close. She was one of his first readers, his confidante and most constant friend and supporter throughout his life.

He studied at the Lycée Lakanal in Sceaux, Hauts-de-Seine, near Paris, where he prepared for the entrance examination to the École Normale Supérieure. He met there fellow student Jacques Rivière, and the two became close friends, though it took a while as Henri's rebellious and playful nature first kept Jacques at bay. He was then the leader of a group of boys who were fighting against hazing, and circulating revolutionary petitions. About their growing friendship, Jacques Rivière wrote: "Underneath his untamed exterior, I found him to be tender, naive, filled with a sweet, dreamy sap, even infinitely more vulnerable than me, which is saying something, in the face of life". The two of them had long and insightful talks and shared the same sensitivity and love for words and poetry, especially the Symbolist movement.

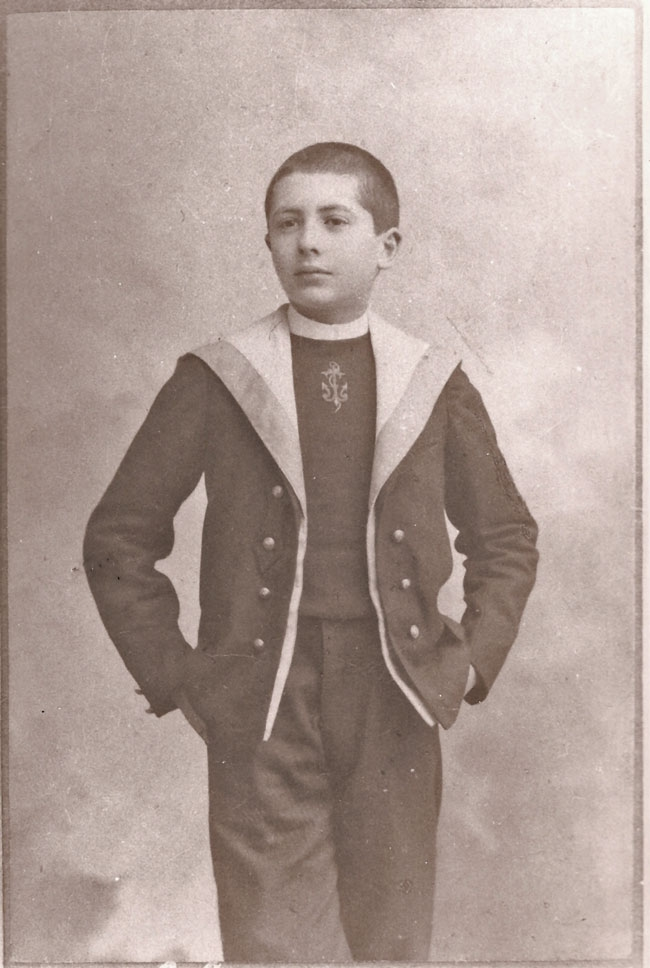
Alain-Fournier at Lycée Voltaire in Paris in 1898

In early 1905, he started to write poems such as "L'ondée" (The shower) and "Conte du soleil et de la route" (Tale of the sun and the road). He shared them with his sister Isabelle, who loved them and wrote him: "Only in you have I truly sensed a strong and ardent soul, a poet's soul, someone who suffers and feels; a bare soul, stripped from all these things that spoil and darken all the others, and only with you have I felt that I was really me, that I could show everything, that you would understand everything".

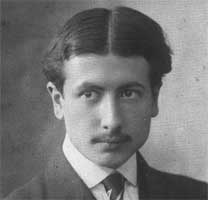
Alain-Fournier in 1905

On the first of June 1905, while he was taking a stroll along the banks of the Seine, Henri saw Yvonne de Quièvrecourt as she was walking in the other direction. He was amazed and followed her aboard a river boat and in the streets, to the house she was staying at. He came back there a few times in the following days, hoping to meet her. Ten days later, on 11 June, he finally had his chance as she was going out on her own. He followed her again aboard a streetcar, inside a church and in the streets, until he plucked up the courage to talk to her. Yvonne first rebuffed him, but he eventually won her trust, and they walked and talked together. This moment was faithfully fictionalized in Le Grand Meaulnes, when Augustin Meaulnes meets Yvonne De Galais for the first time. Yvonne (who was actually engaged) ended up mysteriously saying: "We are children, we acted foolishly" and asked Henri to not follow her again as she was leaving, though, a few steps further, she turned around to look at him for a long time before disappearing in the crowd. A few days later, Henri put his recollection of these moments on paper in great detail.

During the same summer, Henri Fournier spent a few weeks in London, where he was doing translation work in a wallpaper factory. He attended a garden-party in Chiswick that later served as an inspiration for Frantz De Galais' wedding party in "Le Grand Meaulnes". Though he met several young English girls who were eager to spend time with him, he couldn't keep his mind off Yvonne and kept to himself. In letters, he started to confide in Jacques Rivière about her, stating: "I wish I could talk to you about her, whose face suddenly came back the other night with a frightening clarity to stir me to my heart, to stir me until I cried. I believe it is not only a little romantic episode". He also wrote and shared with him his latest poem "A travers les étés" (From summer to summer), that tells the tale of their encounter.

Back in Paris from 1905 to 1907 to finish his studies, Henri Fournier expressed in letters how oppressed he felt, that his studies and the idea of pursuing a career became meaningless to him, and that he felt unable to please his parents in that regard. He wrote to Jacques: "Since I got here, there is like something suffocating me. I am fighting with all I have to pick up this courage and confidence that fell down. It's hard and dark and inexplicable". With Isabelle, he shared: "This exam doesn't speak to me. Far from being an ideal, it's not even a temporary goal or a first step to make. From now on, I can't bring myself to use my brain for this. [...] My life doesn't lie in studying until cerebral exhaustion. I am looking for my life. My only regret is for my parents. Since a long time, I have ceased to see through their eyes. And I will not fulfill their ideal, that they spent much money on". During these same years, he was often coming back to wait in front of the house where he saw Yvonne the previous year (though she never returned) and in January 1906, he wrote his poem "Et maintenant que c'est la pluie" (And now that it's raining) about these moments and his longing for her. On 1 June 1906, he came back at the very same place he first saw Yvonne, waiting for her as he hoped that she was also looking for him, but she did not appear.

In 1907, Henri failed his competitive exam. He had suffered several brain fevers in the previous months due to exhaustion, and he was cognitively impaired and fell asleep during the test. He contemplated becoming a sailor as he loved the ocean, but he didn't follow through, as he had reservations about the work environment. During that same summer, he finally learned that Yvonne was married and he was heartbroken over it, expressing in letters his feeling of new-found utter aloneness. Jacques Rivière was just back from his military service and was able to help him through it, taking him to spend vacations among his own family.

From 1907 to 1909, Henri Fournier performed his military service. At this time, he also published some essays, poems and stories, which were later collected and re-published by the name Miracles. He vividly expressed in many letters to his friends and family how much he was struggling with depression, hopelessness and anxiety during his mandatory time in the army, and how broken and traumatized he felt even as he returned. He became a literary critic, writing for the Paris-Journal. There he met André Gide and Paul Claudel. However, he wasn't satisfied with his job and he was struggling with society's expectations against his own dreams, and the constant fear of wasting his youth. His sister Isabelle and Jacques Rivière had met in 1907 when Jacques stayed with their family for a few weeks, they had soon fallen in love and they married in 1909. Henri was then living with them (and his and Isabelle's parents) up to 1910. The three of them were enjoying Paris' effervescent artistic life together, though Isabelle and Jacques worried about Henri's state of mind, which especially showed in the way he seemed unable to start doing anything. He and Jacques argued about it over letters, which somewhat caused a rift between them as Henri felt generally misunderstood. He shared in several letters experiences that clearly show his emotional distress at the time, such as getting lost while on his way home and feeling like a stranger in a strange land, or spending all day wandering in the rain and having nightmares at night where he couldn't recognize his house and no one could hear him call out for help.

In 1910, he started a two-year on-and-off relationship with Jeanne Bruneau, a country-born milliner who inspired him the character of Valentine in "Le Grand Meaulnes". Their romance almost ended soon after they met, when Jeanne confided in him about former relationships, and that remained the object of several arguments and break-ups between them. He wrote her several romantic and passionate letters which show how much he wanted to share with her his ideal about love and hoped to teach her how to believe in true love the way he did. Though their situation was unusual as they weren't married or engaged (he actually first hid it from them altogether), he introduced her to Isabelle (alongside his beloved niece Jacqueline) and Jacques (who later revealed to Isabelle that she didn't say a word or even look at him), and he contemplated marrying her, but they eventually parted ways, mostly because he couldn't bring himself to propose to anyone but Yvonne and he felt that Jeanne didn't manage to fully understand and enter the fairy world he carried with him as he wrote to her: "Part of my life takes place in this other world, a world filled with imagination and childish paradises. Those who know me very well are aware of that. From several women, already, I hoped that they would be able to go there with me. None ever did".

In 1911, he gave French lessons to fellow poet T. S. Eliot who was then staying in Paris. In 1912, he quit his job to become the personal assistant of the politician Casimir Perrier.

He started writing "Le Grand Meaulnes" in 1910, at his parents' house. He then wrote to Jacques and Isabelle: "For two weeks, I tried to artificially construct this book as I had started. It wasn't going anywhere. Eventually, I threw it all away and [...] I started to write simply, directly, like one of my letters. I threw away all this abstraction and this philosophy I was tangled with. And the most amazing thing is that there's still everything, all of me". Le Grand Meaulnes was finished in early 1913, and was published first in the Nouvelle Revue Française (from July to October 1913) and then as a book, which was nominated for, but did not win, the Prix Goncourt. It was dedicated to his sister Isabelle.

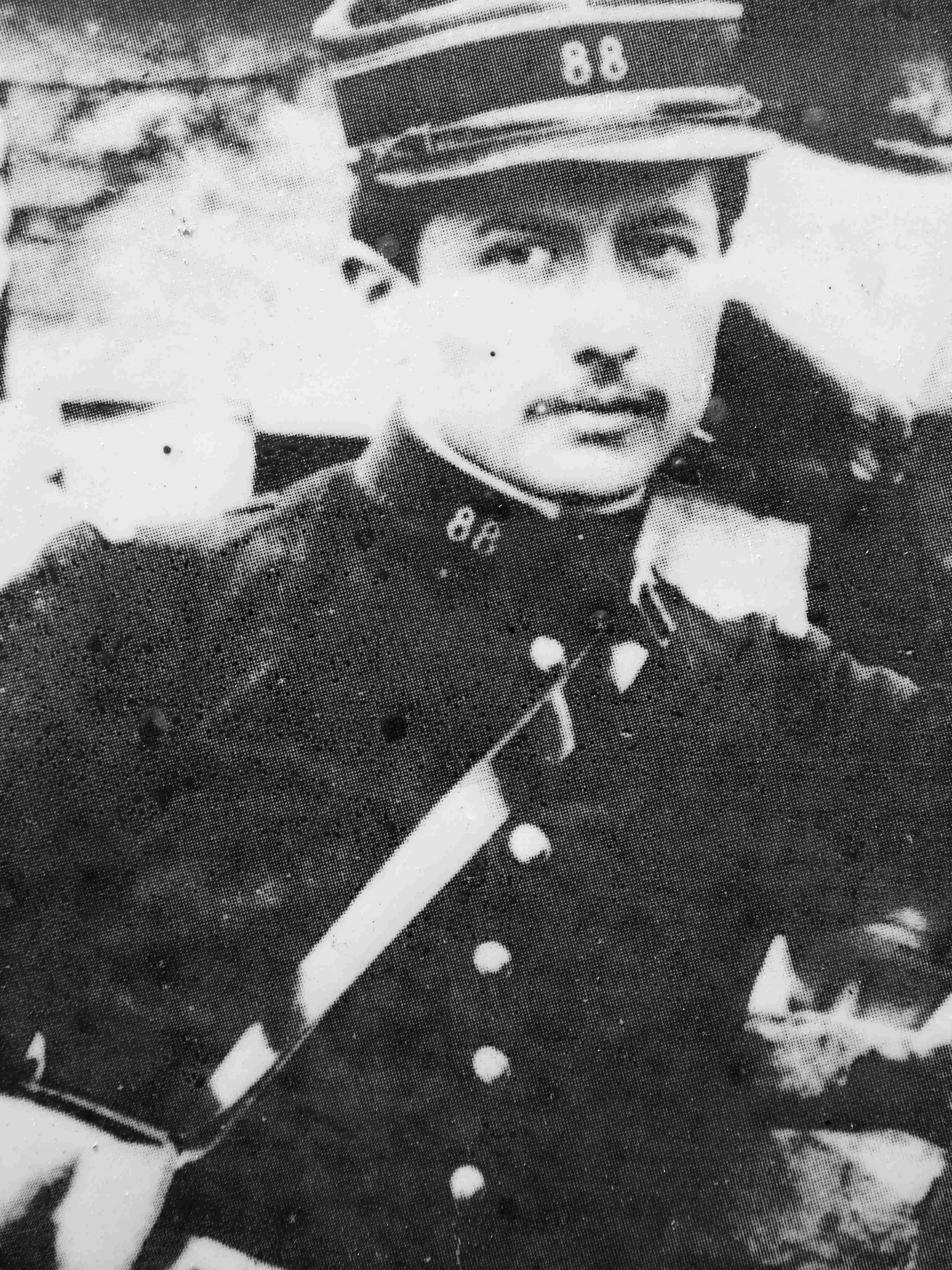
Alain-Fournier in 1913

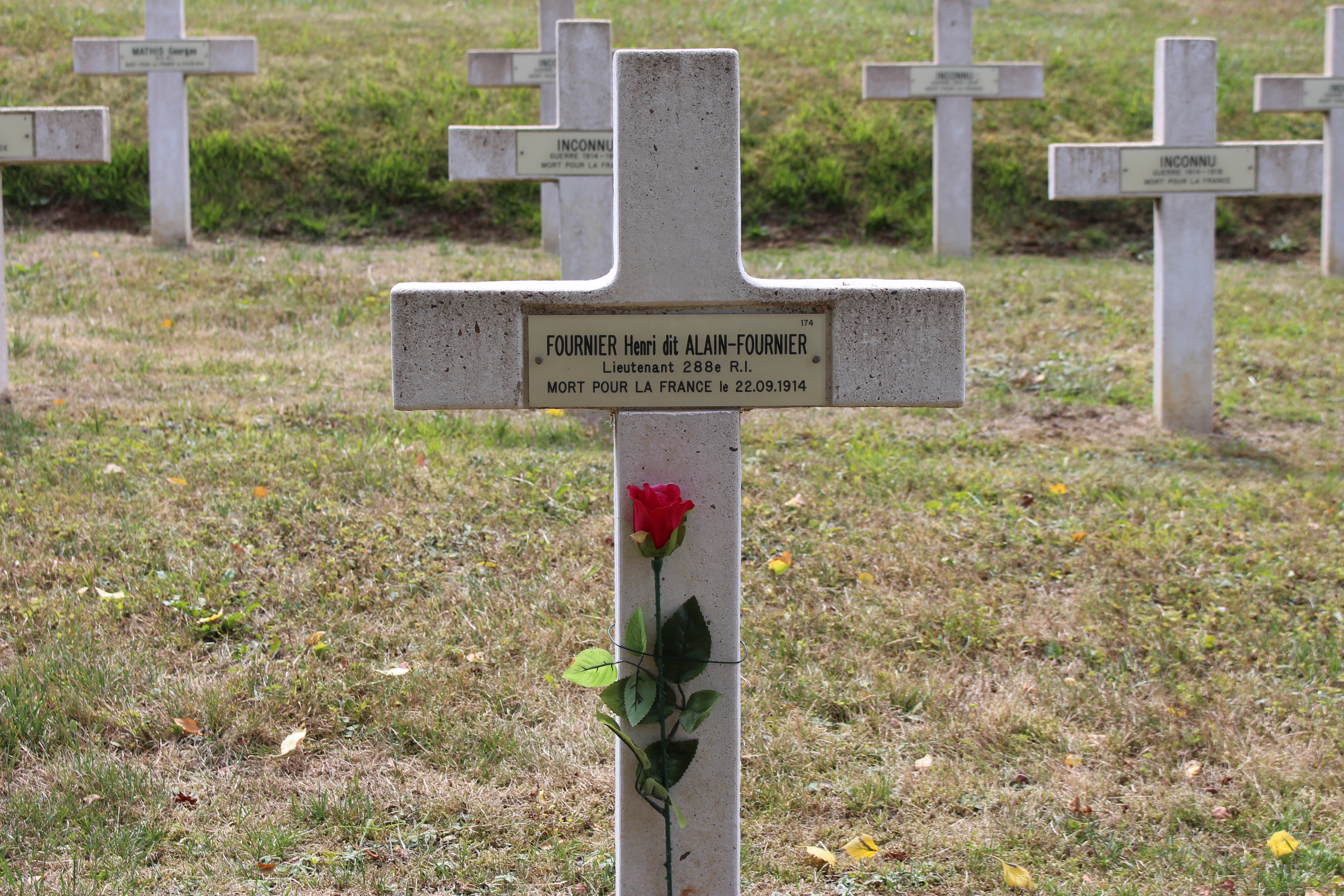
Alain-Fournier's grave in Saint-Remy-la-Calonne

The same year, Henri finally found Yvonne's trail again, as Jacques Rivière's younger brother Marc was studying medicine in Rochefort, the town where her family lived. Marc was in the know since he and Henri had met in 1907, and he brought it up when he was introduced to Yvonne's younger sister. Henri and Yvonne were then able to meet again for a couple days, as she was visiting her family. She introduced him to her mother, her sister and her children, and they could talk about their first encounter and what it meant to them. Henri also showed her a letter he wrote for her the previous year, expressing his love and faithfulness and telling her that his then upcoming novel, "Le Grand Meaulnes" was all about her.

In 1914, Alain-Fournier started to work on a second novel, Colombe Blanchet, but this remained unfinished when he had to join the Army as a lieutenant that August. He died fighting near Vaux-lès-Palameix (Meuse) one month later, on 22 September 1914. His body remained unidentified until 1991, at which time he was buried in the cemetery of Saint-Remy-la-Calonne. According to some sources, the patrol which Alain-Fournier was part of received the order to "shoot at German soldiers encountered unexpectedly and who were stretcher-bearers"; the patrol obeyed, which the Germans would have considered a violation of international conventions. According to Gerd Krumeich, professor at the University of Düsseldorf, it is correct that Alain-Fournier's patrol attacked a German ambulance, but it is difficult to establish the facts.

Most of the writing of Alain-Fournier was published posthumously: Miracles (a volume of poems and essays) in 1924, his correspondence with Jacques Rivière in 1926 and his letters to his family in 1930. His notes and sketches for Colombe Blanchet have also been published.

== Albin Schram manuscripts ==
A correspondence between Alain-Fournier and an unidentified woman was found in the collection of Albin Schram. It is a grateful letter for her introduction to a Monsieur Hébrard and refers to his next work:

Il m'a proposé pour Le Temps ce qu'il était le plus logique de me proposer: lui apporter mon prochain roman—ce que j'ai promis bien volontiers. Ce second roman est, pour l'instant un peu retardé par une nouvelle oeuvre qui s'est mise au travers de ma route et qui ne me laisse pas beaucoup de répit. Mais j'espère bien avant la fin de l'année avoir terminé Colombe Blanchet.

He has proposed to me for Le Temps that which was the most logical thing to propose to me: to bring him my next novel—which I have promised quite willingly. This second novel is, for the moment, somewhat delayed by a new work which has placed itself across my path and which doesn't leave me much respite. But I hope well before the end of the year to have finished Colombe Blanchet.

== Honours and awards ==
- Chevalier of the Order of Legion of Honour
- Croix de Guerre 1914-1918

== AJRAF ==
In 1975, L'Association des Amis de Jacques Rivière et d'Alain-Fournier (AJRAF, Association of the Friends of Jacques Rivière and of Alain-Fournier) was founded by Alain Rivière, the son of Jacques Rivière and nephew of Alain-Fournier, to "promote knowledge of these two authors and to gather their friends together".

== Works ==
- Le Grand Meaulnes (1913)
- Colombe Blanchet (unfinished novel)
- Lettre au Petit B
- Miracles (poems)

== Inspiration for artists ==
Alain-Fournier has inspired the artist Jean-Louis Berthod, from Albens, who carved in 2014 a limewood board 130 by 140 centimetres (51 by 55 in) inspired by Le Grand Meaulnes.

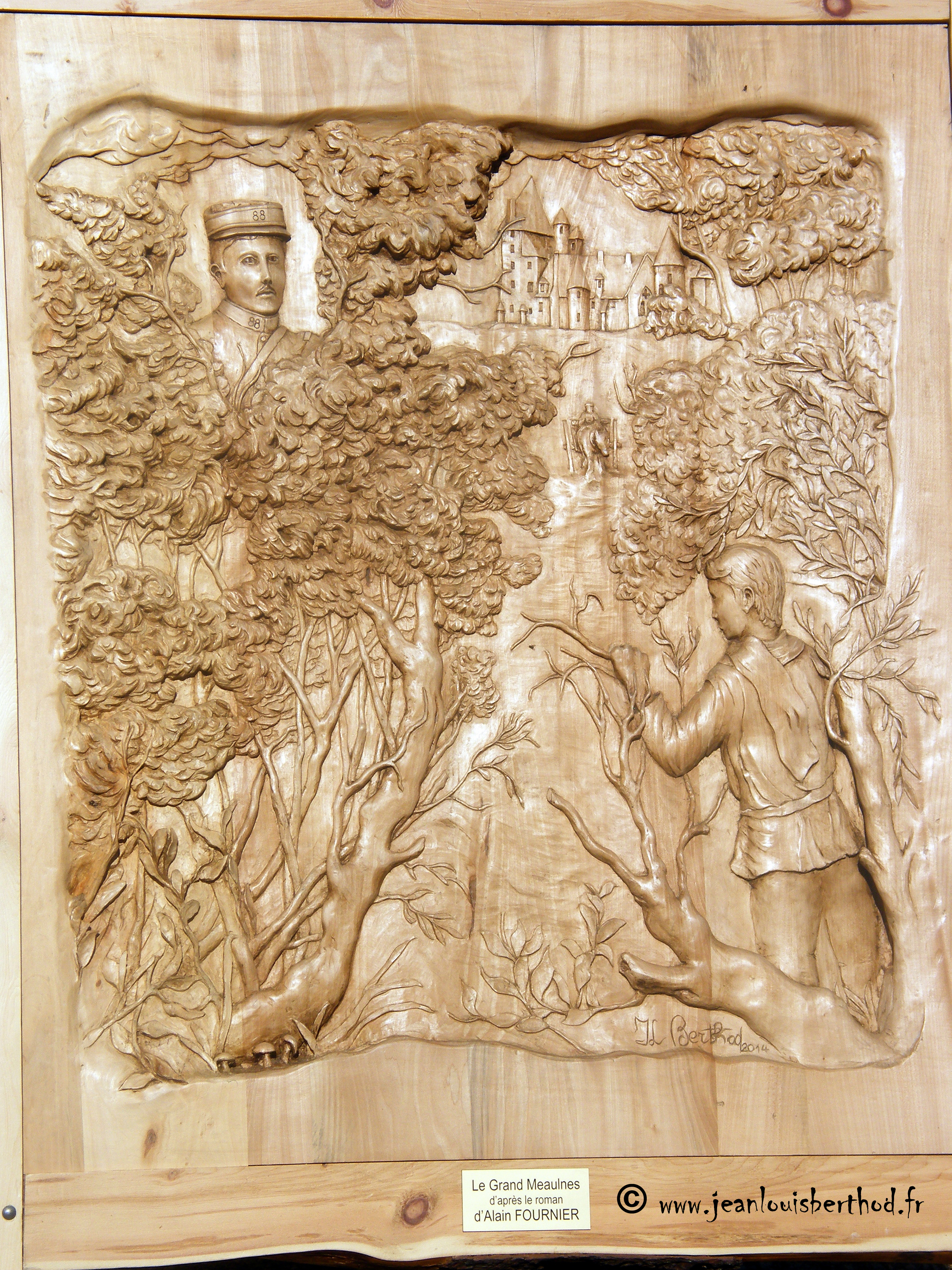
Le Grand Meaulnes by Jean-Louis Berthod, French sculptor from Albens

== See also ==
- Nançay and the Loire Valley, widely thought to be the inspiration for the setting for Le Grand Meaulnes
- Prix Alain-Fournier
