= Hautecourt-lès-Broville =

- Associated commune of Abaucourt-Hautecourt
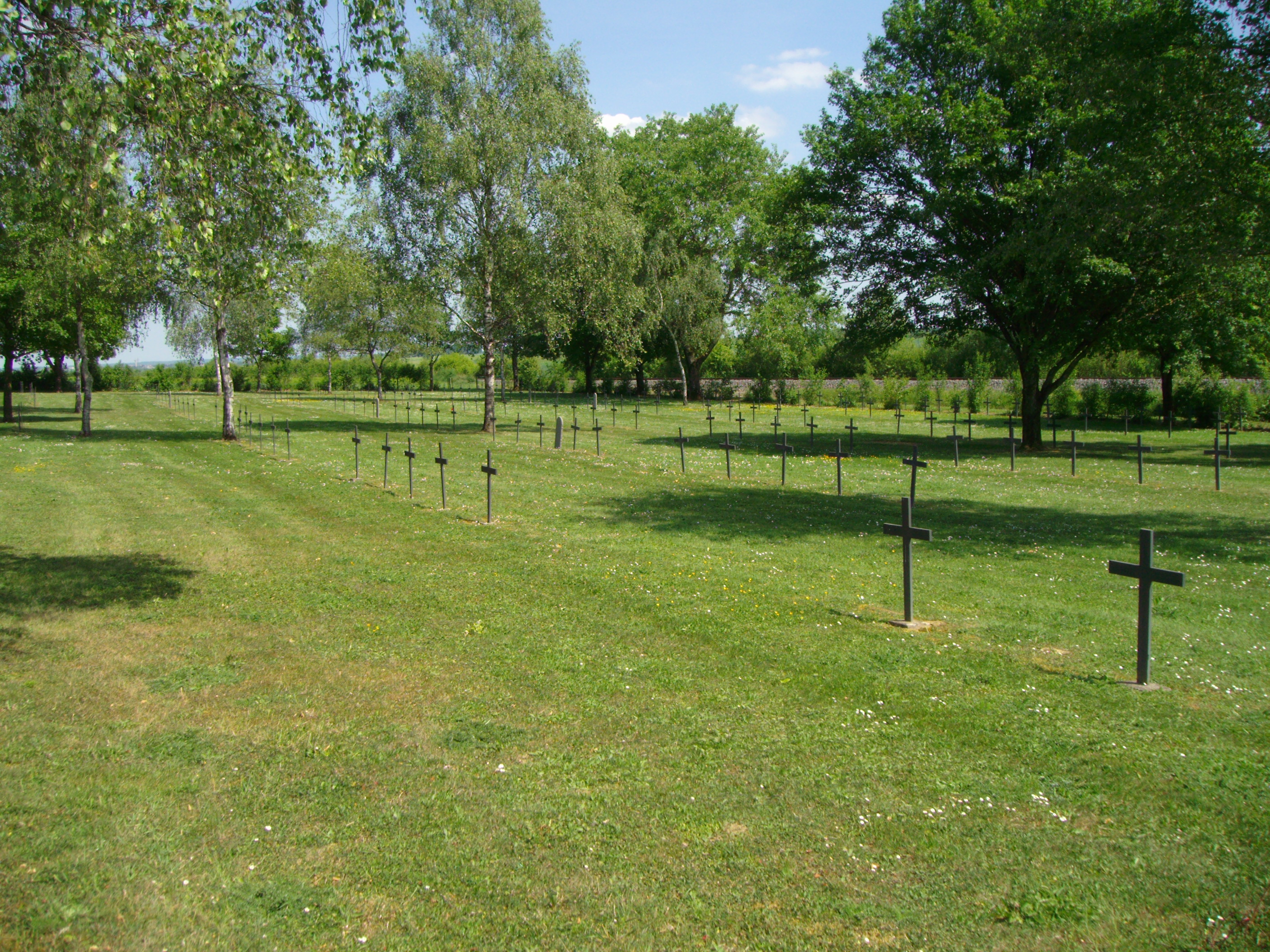
- German military cemetery
- Location of Hautecourt-lès-Broville
- Location within France Location within Grand Est
- Coordinates: 49°11′39″N 5°33′31″E
- Country: France
- Region: Grand Est
- Department: Meuse
- Arrondissement: Verdun
- Commune: Abaucourt-Hautecourt
- Area^{1}: 5 km^{2} (1.9 sq mi)
- Population (2022): 32
  - Density: 6.4/km^{2} (17/sq mi)
- Time zone: UTC+01:00 (CET)
  - Summer (DST): UTC+02:00 (CEST)
- Postal code: 55400
- ^{1} French Land Register data, which excludes lakes, ponds, glaciers > 1 km^{2} (0.386 sq mi or 247 acres) and river estuaries.

Hautecourt-lès-Broville is an associated commune in the Meuse department in the Grand Est region.
