= Eix (disambiguation) =

Eix is a commune in the Meuse department in Grand Est in north-eastern France. Eix or EIX may also refer to:

- Eix Transversal, a highway in Catalonia, Spain. It crosses the
- Vauxhall Wyvern EIX, a 1950s automobile
- NYSE symbol of Edison International, a California public utility holding company

Ei(x) may refer to the Exponential integral.
