= Sanctinus of Meaux =

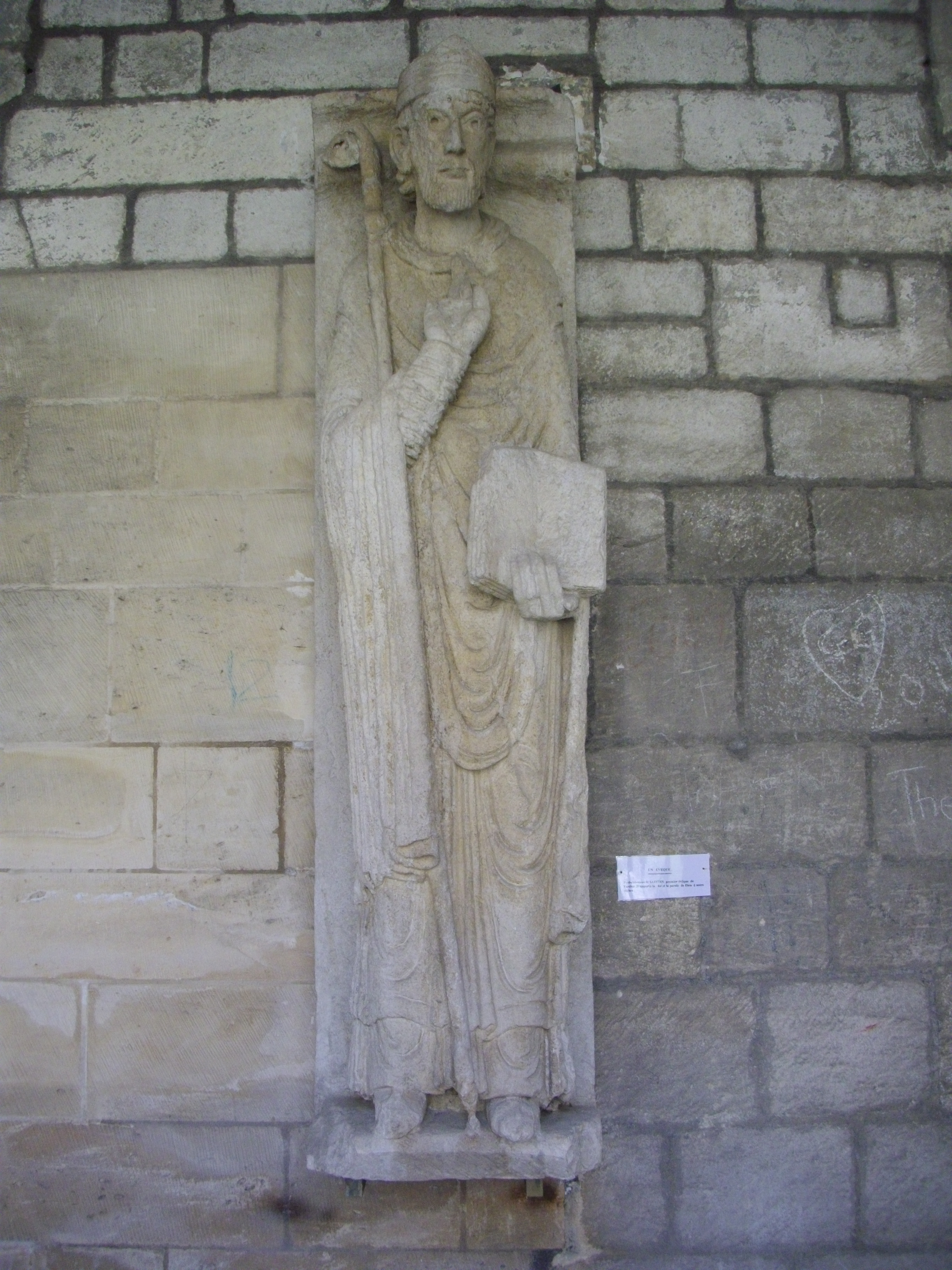
- Statue of Saint Sanctinus in the cloister of Verdun Cathedral (Meuse, France)

Martyr, bishop
- Born: c. 270
- Died: 356; Meaux, France
- Venerated in: Catholic Church
- Major shrine: Verdun Cathedral
- Feast: October 11

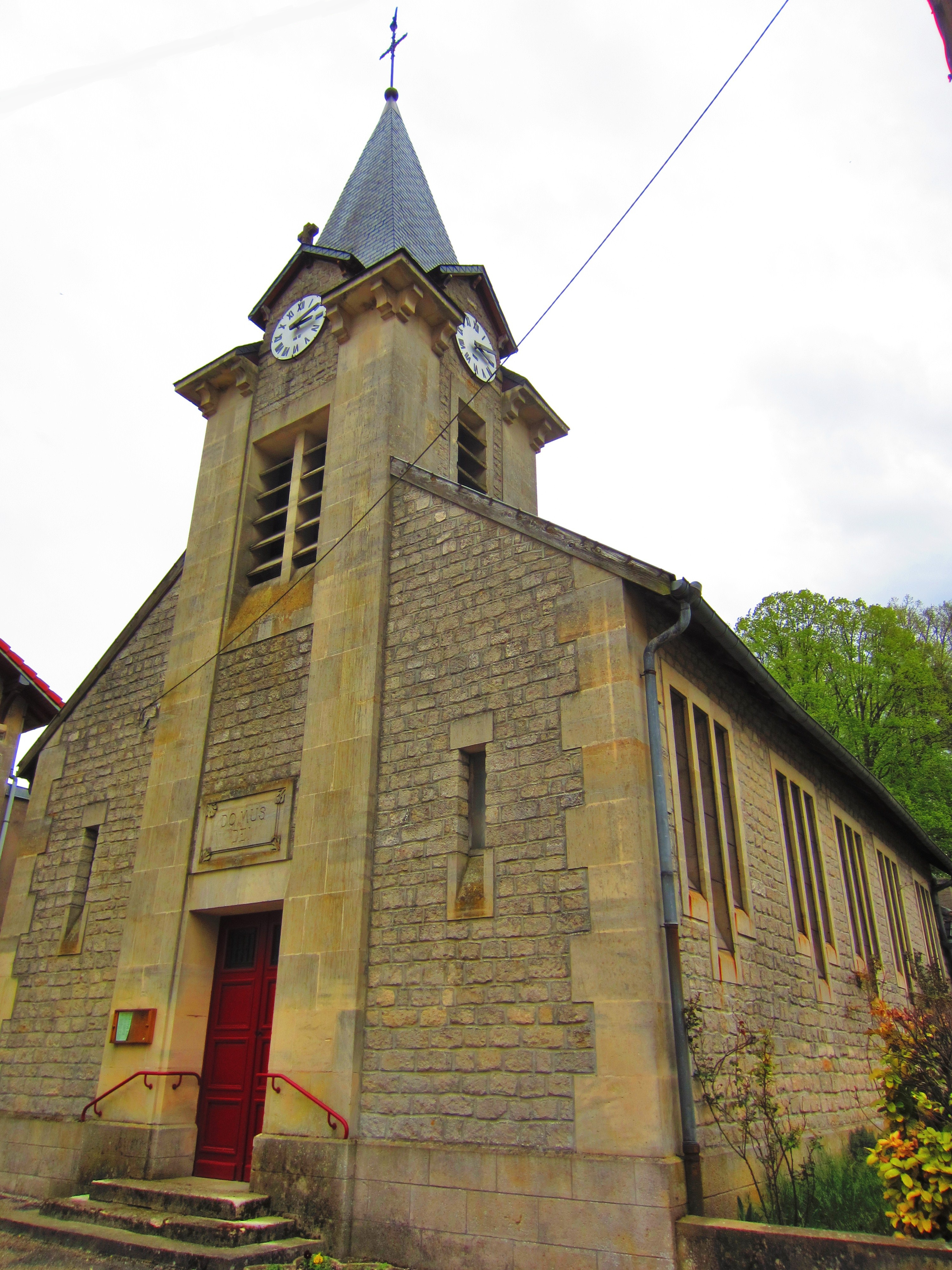
The church of Saint Sanctinus (Saint Saintin) in Vaux-lès-Palameix

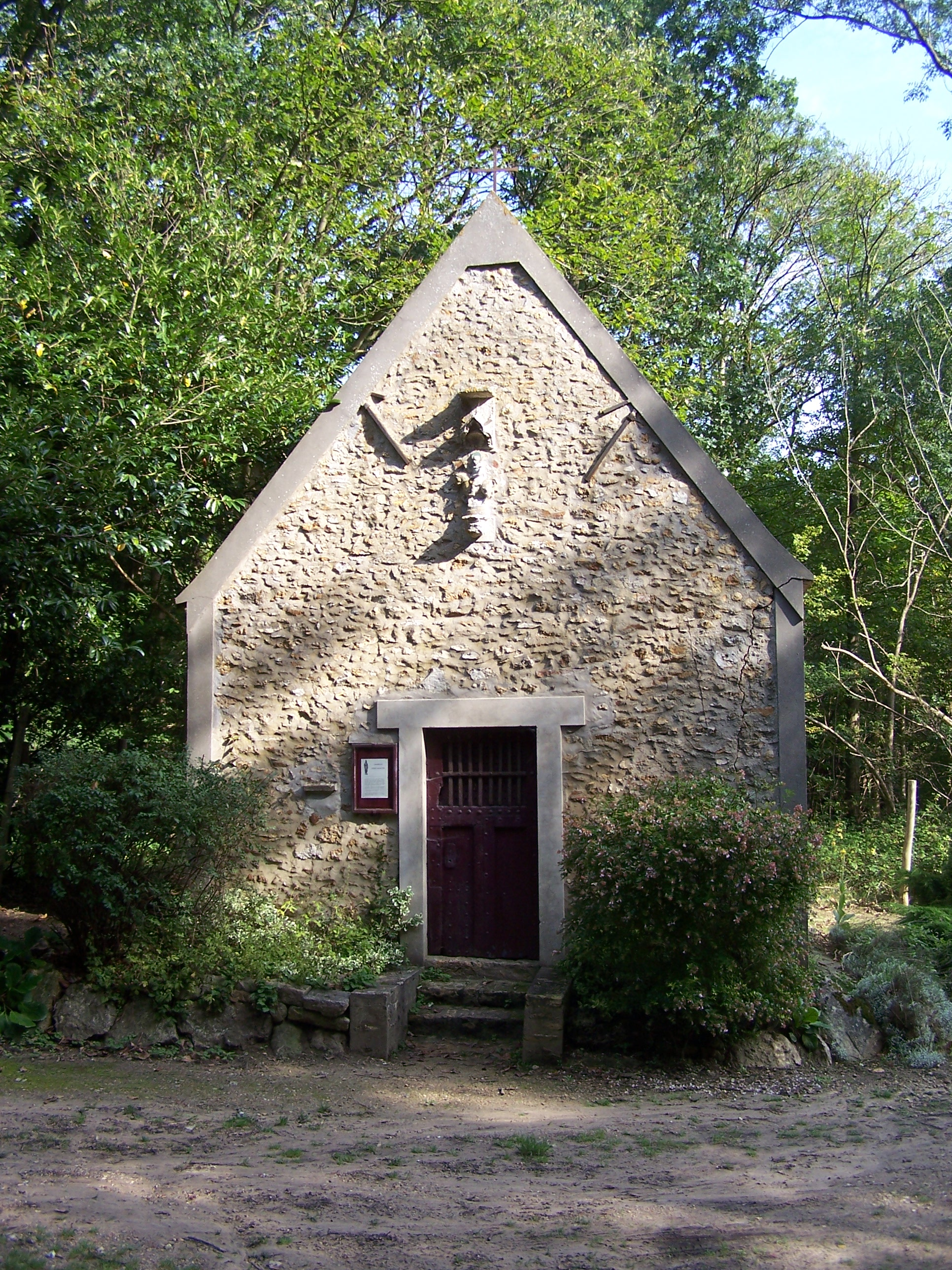
The chapel of Saint Santinus (Saint Santin) in Auteuil-le-Roi

Saint Sanctinus of Meaux (French: Saintin de Meaux, also Saint Santin, Saintin or Sanctin; Latin: Sanctinus; c. 270 – 356) was a Gallo-Roman bishop and missionary, traditionally named as the first bishop of Meaux and also of Verdun.

== Legend ==
According to the legend of Hincmar in the 9th century, Dionysius of Paris trained several priests to preach in Gaul. He appointed Sanctinus as bishop of Chartres and of Meaux. When Dionysius was mortally wounded by soldiers of the usurper Domitian, he sent Sanctinus and a certain Antoninus to Athens to inform the Athenians of his martyrdom. En route in the Roman castellum of Verdun, Sanctinus left the gravely ill Antoninus behind. A local innkeeper promised to take care of Antoninus for a fee. Sanctinus learned in Rome of Antoninus' death and the innkeeper's evil role in it. Sanctinus returned to Verdun in about 330, evangelised the city of Verdun, became its first bishop, and founded a church dedicated to Saints Peter and Paul.

== Narrative ==
"...Sanctinus's background and literally every aspect of the history of his cult is clouded in obscurity." The name Sanctinus, (Santin or Saintin), derived from the Latin Sanctus, because his real name is not known. According to tradition, Sanctinus was born about 270. A disciple of Dionysius of Paris, Sanctinus is considered the first bishop in both Meaux and Verdun. He preached the gospel throughout the area, and he is said to have preached also in Picardy and in Champagne. His chief helper was the holy priest Antoninus (Antonius, Antoninestus), whom he is said to have raised from the dead. The Bollandists have made a thorough investigation of the legend, and they concluded that it is not historically sustainable. They put the time of his apostolic activity at the middle of the 4th century.

As bishop of Verdun, in 332 he built the first Christian oratory on Mont Saint Vanne on the site of a pagan temple and consecrated it to the holy apostles Saint-Pierre-et-Saint-Paul. A second oratory was dedicated to Saint John the Baptist (Saint Jean-Baptiste). When Sanctinus was forced to join his persecuted community in Meaux, the first bishop of Verdun entrusted the episcopate to Saint Maurus (fr: Maur), the first Verdunois ordained priest. There is some consensus that Sanctinus died in prison in Meaux around 356.

== Veneration ==
In later centuries, controversy arose as to whether it was one or two different bishops. This controversy goes hand in hand over where the relics of Sanctinus lie: in the cathedral of Verdun or in Meaux. Thus, there is a story that around 1044 starving citizens of Meaux sold the relics of Sanctinus to itinerant merchants of Verdun. His tooth is preserved in a reliquary in Verdun Cathedral. This explains the veneration of Sanctinus both in Meaux, where he is held a martyr, and at Verdun, where he is considered a bishop and confessor. In the thirteenth century Meaux gave some of Sanctinus's relics to St. Denis.

In the Roman Martyrology of 1627, he is commemorated on 22 September. More recently his feast day is celebrated on 11 October, his day of death.

There are several dedications to him, including churches at Mogeville, Vaux-lès-Palameix and Courgeon, and chapels at Auteuil and Bellême. A votive feast has long been celebrated on September 22 at Auteuil-le-Roi in the department of Yvelines in the region of Île-de-France, in honor of Sanctinus, who preached there.

== See also ==
- Saint-Santin
