= Frank Davison =

Frank Davison may refer to:

- Frank Cyril Shaw Davison (1893–1960), Canadian-born writer
- Frank Davison (translator), British translator
- Frank Dalby Davison (1893–1970), Australian novelist and short story writer
- Frank B. Davison (1855–1935), considered one of the founding fathers of Texas City, Texas

== See also ==
- Frank Davidson (1872–1951), English cricketer
