= Moranville =

Moranville may refer to:

- Moranville Township, Minnesota, United States
- Moranville, Meuse, a commune in the Meuse département, France
