= Dieppe-sous-Douaumont =

- Commune
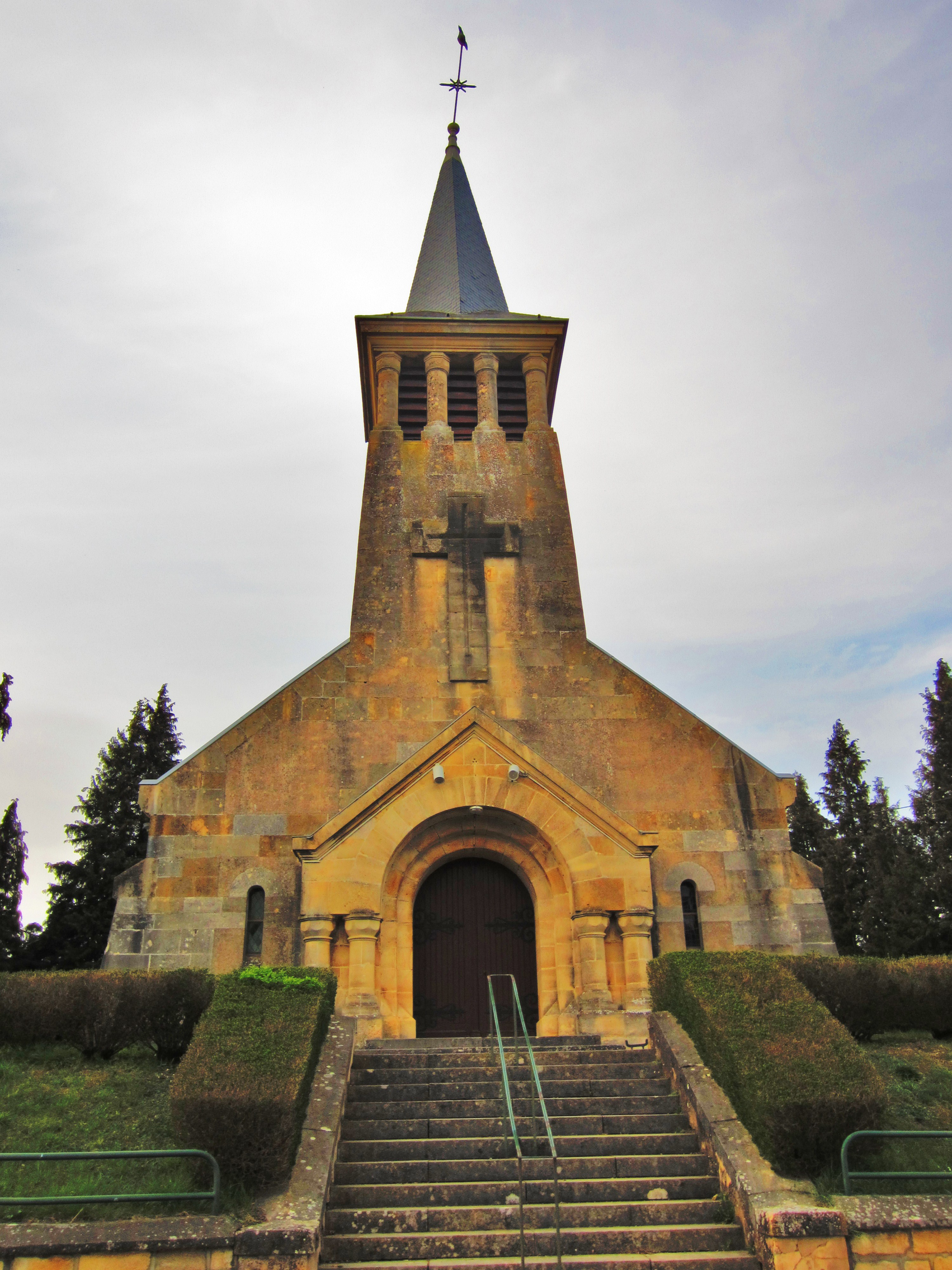
- The church in Dieppe-sous-Douaumont

- Coat of arms
- Location of Dieppe-sous-Douaumont
- Location within France Location within Grand Est
- Coordinates: 49°13′16″N 5°30′38″E
- Country: France
- Region: Grand Est
- Department: Meuse
- Arrondissement: Verdun
- Canton: Belleville-sur-Meuse
- Intercommunality: CC du pays d'Étain

Government
  - Mayor (2020–2026): Jean-Christophe Paton
- Area^{1}: 15.06 km^{2} (5.81 sq mi)
- Elevation: 234 m (768 ft)
- Highest elevation: 269 m (883 ft)
- Lowest elevation: 212 m (696 ft)
- Population (2023): 187
  - Density: 12.4/km^{2} (32.2/sq mi)
- Time zone: UTC+01:00 (CET)
  - Summer (DST): UTC+02:00 (CEST)
- INSEE/Postal code: 55153 /55400
- ^{1} French Land Register data, which excludes lakes, ponds, glaciers > 1 km^{2} (0.386 sq mi or 247 acres) and river estuaries.

Dieppe-sous-Douaumont (French pronunciation: [djɛp su dwomɔ̃], literally Dieppe under Douaumont) is a commune in the Meuse department in Grand Est in north-eastern France.

== See also ==
- Communes of the Meuse department
