= Le Grand Meaulnes =

1913 novel by Alain-Fournier

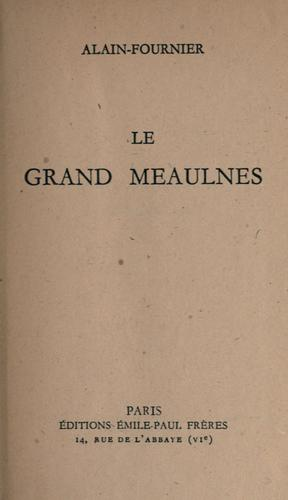
- Author: Alain-Fournier
- Translator: Françoise Delisle
- Language: French
- Genre: Bildungsroman
- Publisher: Émile-Paul Frères
- Publication date: 1913
- Publication place: France
- English publication date: 1928

Le Grand Meaulnes (French: [lə ɡʁɑ̃ moln]) is the only novel by French author Alain-Fournier, who was killed in the first month of World War I. The novel, published in 1913, a year before the author's death, is somewhat autobiographical, especially the name of the heroine Yvonne, for whom he had a doomed infatuation in Paris. Fifteen-year-old François Seurel narrates the story of his friendship with seventeen-year-old Augustin Meaulnes as the latter searches for his lost love. Impulsive, reckless and heroic, Meaulnes embodies the romantic ideal, the search for the unobtainable, and the mysterious world between childhood and adulthood.

== Title ==
The title is French for "The Great Meaulnes". The difficulties in translating the French grand (meaning big, tall, great, etc.) and le domaine perdu ("lost estate/domain/demesne") have led to a variety of English titles, including The Wanderer, The Lost Domain, Meaulnes: The Lost Domain, The Wanderer or The End of Youth, Le Grand Meaulnes: The Land of the Lost Contentment, The Lost Estate (Le Grand Meaulnes) and Big Meaulnes (Le Grand Meaulnes).

Le Grand Meaulnes inspired the title of F. Scott Fitzgerald's novel The Great Gatsby. Despite this similarity, French translators of Fitzgerald's novel struggled in the same way to render the word "great" and chose Gatsby le magnifique (literally Gatsby the Magnificent).

== Plot summary ==
François Seurel, the 15-year-old narrator of the book, is the son of Mr Seurel, who is the director of the mixed-ages school in a small village in the Sologne, a region of lakes and sandy forests in the heartland of France. François is intrigued when 17-year-old Augustin Meaulnes, a bright young man from a modest background, arrives at the school. Because of his height, Augustin acquires the nickname "grand" ("tall"). He becomes a hero figure to the class and runs away one evening on an escapade where, after getting lost, he chances on a magical costume party where he is enchanted by the girl of his dreams, Yvonne de Galais, a character inspired by the real-life Yvonne de Quièvrecourt. She lives with her widowed father and her somewhat odd brother Frantz in a vast and ancient family château, Les Sablonnières, which has seen better days. The party was being held to welcome Frantz and the girl he was to marry, Valentine. However, when she does not appear, Frantz attempts suicide but fails.

After returning to school, Meaulnes has only one idea: to again find the mysterious château and the girl with whom he has now fallen in love. However, his local searches fail while at the same time a bizarre young man shows up at the school. It is Frantz de Galais under a different name, trying to escape the pain of having been rejected. Frantz, Meaulnes, and François become friends, and Frantz gives Meaulnes the address of a house in Paris where he says Meaulnes will find his sister, Yvonne de Galais. Meaulnes leaves for Paris only to learn no one lives in the house anymore. He writes to his friend François: "...it is better to forget me. It would be better to forget everything".

François, who has now become a school teacher like his father, finally manages to find Yvonne de Galais and reunites her with Meaulnes. Yvonne still lives with her aging father in what is left of les Sablonnières, which is closer than the two young friends had first imagined in earlier years. Yvonne is still single and confesses to Meaulnes that he is and has always been the love of her life. She accepts, with her father's blessings, Meaulnes' marriage proposal. However, the restless Meaulnes leaves Yvonne the day after their wedding in order to find her lost brother Frantz (whom he had once promised to help) and re-unite him with his fiancée, Valentine. Yvonne remains at the château, where she gives birth to a little girl but dies two days later.

Eventually François lives in the house Meaulnes and Yvonne lived in and raises the little girl there, while waiting for the return of his friend Meaulnes. While looking through old papers, François discovers a handwritten diary by Meaulnes. During the years in Paris (before François brought Meaulnes and Yvonne back together), Meaulnes had met and romanced Valentine, the fiancée who had jilted Frantz on the night of the party.

Meaulnes does return, after a year and eight months, having brought Frantz and Valentine back together. He discovers that Yvonne has died and left a daughter, whom he claims. Four years have elapsed since the beginning of the story.

== Inspiration ==
François Seurel’s childhood is based on Alain-Fournier’s own childhood in the country, where his parents were the school teachers. François’ personality also mirrors his own at that age, as he was more obedient and quiet than he grew up to be.

Everything about Augustin Meaulnes is based on Alain-Fournier himself from his teenage years: his personality, his hopes and dreams and his idealistic quest.

Yvonne De Galais is based on Yvonne de Quièvrecourt, the girl he met, fell in love with and lost track of when he was 19, and who remained the love of his life. Augustin and Yvonne’s first encounter tells almost exactly the tale of their own. Augustin’s quest to find her again mirrors Alain-Fournier’s in Paris from 1905 to 1907, except that his Yvonne was actually married when he found that out.

Frantz De Galais is also Alain-Fournier’s alter ego, reflecting his evolving identity emerging after his own heartbreak: his refusal to fit in the confinement of adulthood, his thirst for freedom and imagination and his hypersensitivity making him be seen as emotionally unstable by regular people.

The character of Valentine and her relationship with Meaulnes is based on Jeanne Bruneau, Alain-Fournier’s sweetheart from 1910 to 1912 and their romance. Like Meaulnes, he felt like he still belonged to Yvonne, but he was also scared of what would become of Jeanne if he didn’t watch over her, and he was reproaching her for not believing enough.

== Translations ==
As of 2012, several English translations were available:

- by Françoise Delisle as The Wanderer in 1928. This includes an introduction by Havelock Ellis
- as The Lost Domain (1959) by Frank Davison.
- as Meaulnes: The Lost Domain (1966) by Sandra Morris.
- as The Wanderer or The End of Youth (1971) by Lowell Bair.
- as Le Grand Meaulnes: The Land of the Lost Contentment (1979) by Katherine Vivian.
- as The Lost Estate (Le Grand Meaulnes) (2007) by Robin Buss.
- as Big Meaulnes (Le Grand Meaulnes) (2012) by Jennifer Hashmi.

== Adaptations ==
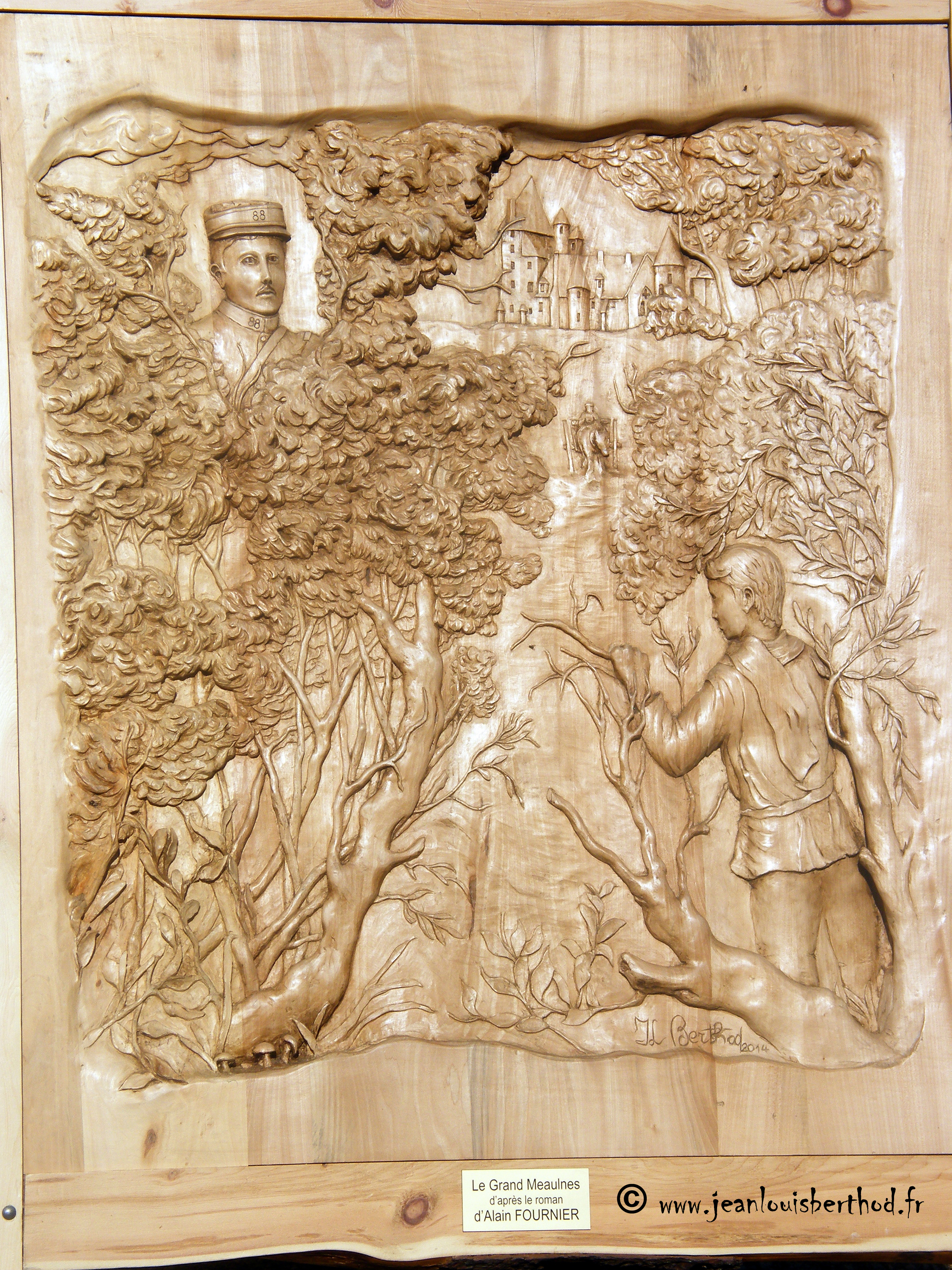
Le Grand Meaulnes of Jean-Louis Berthod, French sculptor of Albens, Savoy. Sculpture made in lime-wood (130 cm x 140 cm) in 2014.

The novel was made into a 1967 French film with the same name, known in English under an English title of the novel: The Wanderer. Another film adaptation, Le Grand Meaulnes, was released in November 2006, starring Nicolas Duvauchelle as Meaulnes, Jean-Baptiste Maunier as Seurel and Clémence Poésy.

An adaptation of the novel by Barbara Bray with the title The Milk of Paradise was broadcast on the BBC Home Service in January 1959, starring Albert Finney as Meaulnes and Timothy Bateson as Seurel, with music by Elizabeth Poston. It was rebroadcast on BBC Radio 4 Extra in 2026. A two-part serialisation by Jennifer Howarth was broadcast as the Classic Serial in August 2005, narrated by Simon Russell Beale. The novel was also featured on the BBC Radio 4 programme Book at Bedtime, read by Michael Williams, recorded in 1980 and repeated in 1999.

"Meaulnes the Great" is the title of a 2014 bas-relief (130 cm x 140 cm) carved in limewood by the French artist Jean-Louis Berthod from Albens, Savoy. The relief was inspired by Alain-Fournier's book and is a tribute to the missing people of World War I.

The book is the inspiration for the song 'My Yvonne', the ninth track from UK singer-songwriter Jack Peñate's debut album, Matinée, featuring backing vocals from a then-unknown Adele. Adele is not credited as a featured artist on the song; however, she is credited as a backing vocalist in the album's booklet.

== Appearances in other works ==
Le Grand Meaulnes is referenced multiple times in Simone de Beauvoir’s Memoirs of a Dutiful Daughter.

It is the only book that Sal Paradise carries with him on his travels in Jack Kerouac's On the Road.

In his autobiography Living to Tell the Tale, Gabriel García Márquez remembers a crewmate from his youth who was an insatiable reader and who owned a copy of Le Grand Meaulnes, which became one of the author's preferred literary masterpieces.

The novel is referenced in Our Evenings by Alan Hollinghurst, both to establish a cross-cultural connection between two of the characters and to evoke the romantic imagination of youth.

In David Mitchell's novel Black Swan Green, Madame Crommelynck lends Jason a copy of Le Grand Meaulnes, in the original French, and instructs him to translate it.

== See also ==
- Le Monde's 100 Books of the Century
