= Grimaucourt-en-Woëvre =

- Commune
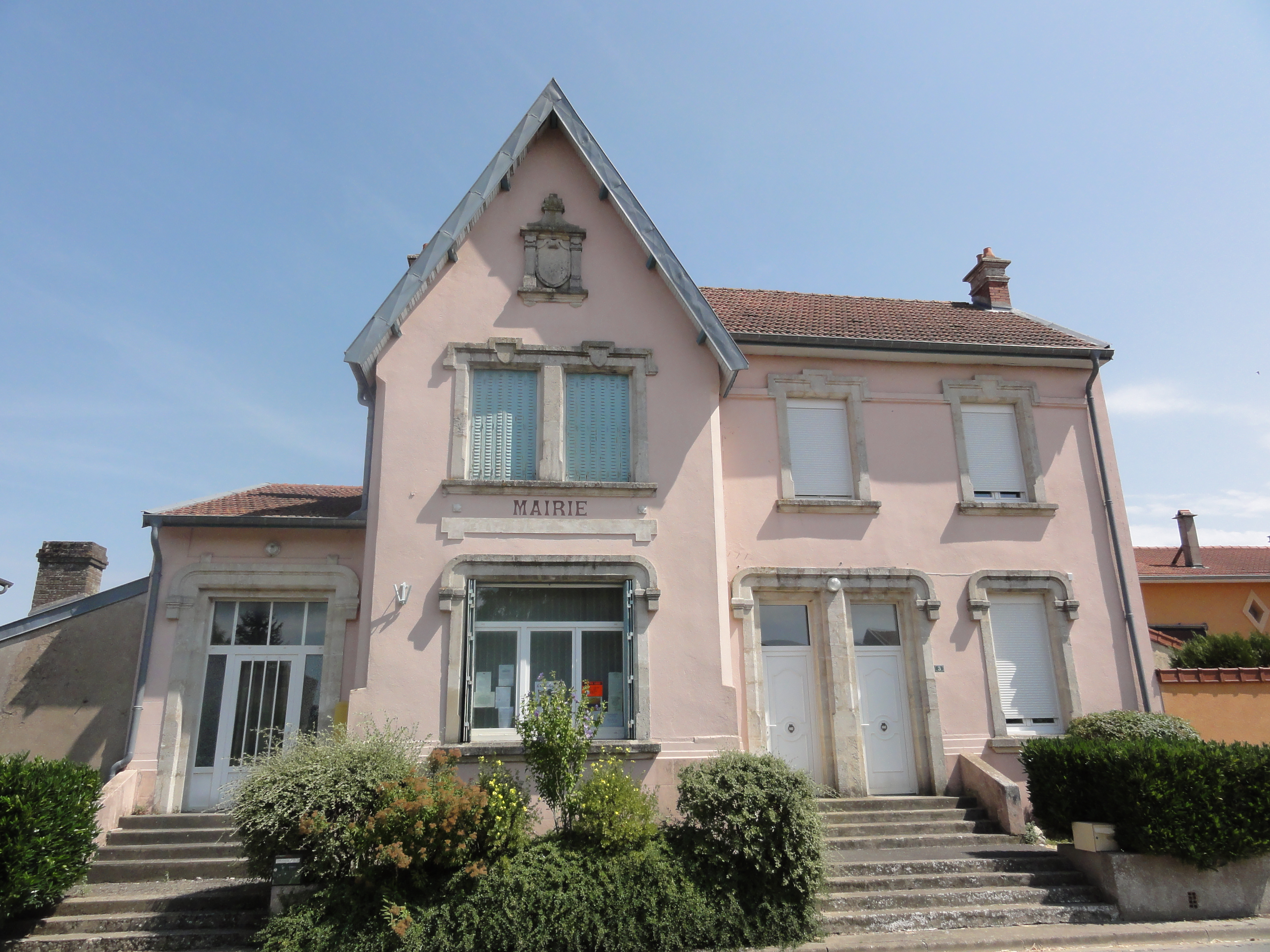
- The town hall in Grimaucourt-en-Woëvre
- Location of Grimaucourt-en-Woëvre
- Location within France Location within Grand Est
- Coordinates: 49°10′29″N 5°33′24″E
- Country: France
- Region: Grand Est
- Department: Meuse
- Arrondissement: Verdun
- Canton: Belleville-sur-Meuse
- Intercommunality: CC du pays d'Étain

Government
  - Mayor (2020–2026): Jean-Paul Franiatte
- Area^{1}: 5.69 km^{2} (2.20 sq mi)
- Elevation: 218 m (715 ft)
- Highest elevation: 229 m (751 ft)
- Lowest elevation: 211 m (692 ft)
- Population (2023): 94
  - Density: 17/km^{2} (43/sq mi)
- Time zone: UTC+01:00 (CET)
  - Summer (DST): UTC+02:00 (CEST)
- INSEE/Postal code: 55219 /55400
- ^{1} French Land Register data, which excludes lakes, ponds, glaciers > 1 km^{2} (0.386 sq mi or 247 acres) and river estuaries.

Grimaucourt-en-Woëvre (French pronunciation: [ɡʁimokuʁ ɑ̃ wavʁ]) is a commune in the Meuse department in Grand Est in north-eastern France.

== See also ==
- Communes of the Meuse department
