= Courgeon =

- Commune
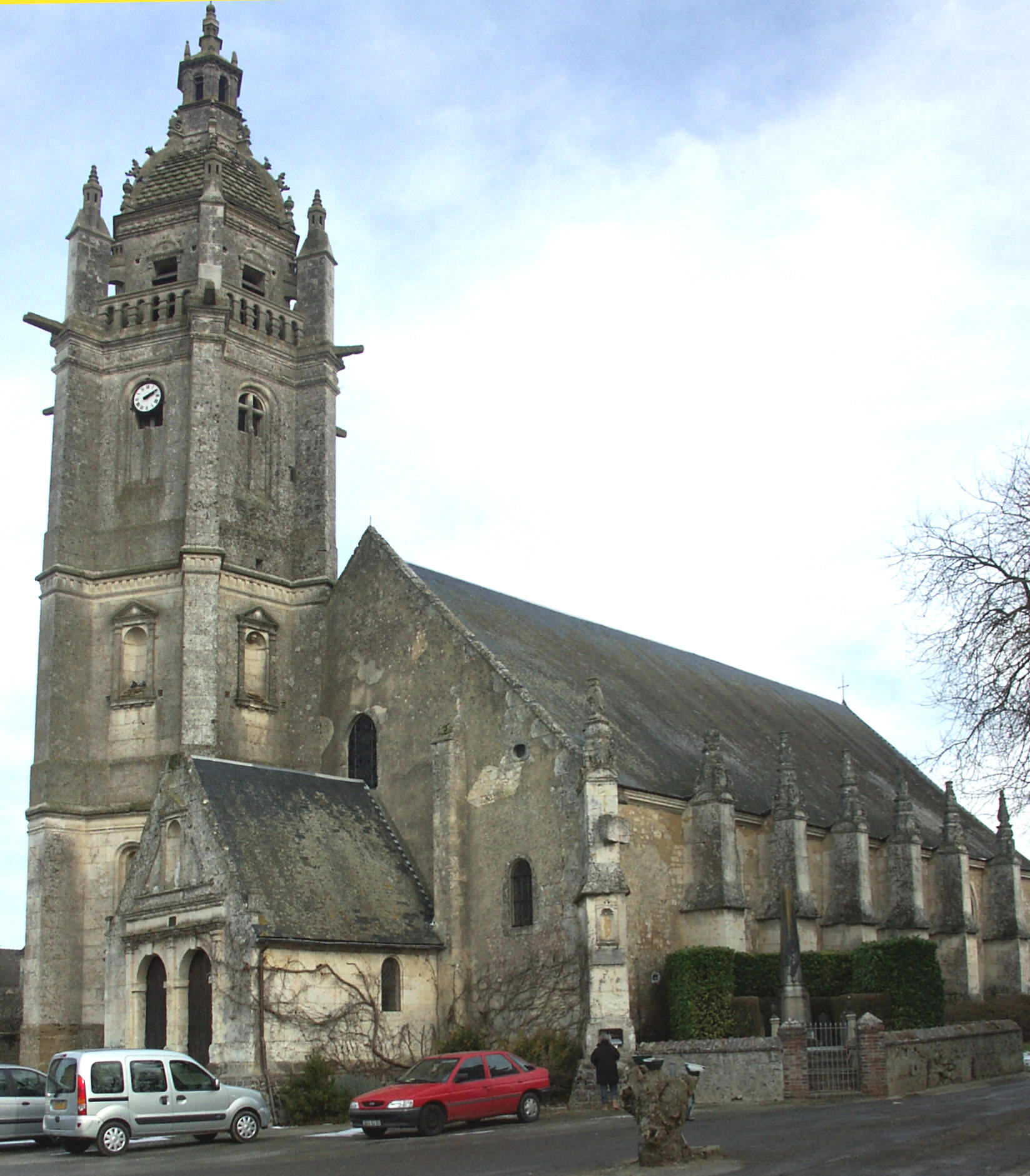
- The church of Notre-Dame and St. Saintin in Courgeon
- Location of Courgeon
- Location within France Location within Normandy
- Coordinates: 48°28′45″N 0°36′46″E
- Country: France
- Region: Normandy
- Department: Orne
- Arrondissement: Mortagne-au-Perche
- Canton: Mortagne-au-Perche
- Intercommunality: Pays de Mortagne au Perche

Government
  - Mayor (2020–2026): Philippe Mercier
- Area^{1}: 10.41 km^{2} (4.02 sq mi)
- Elevation: 166 m (545 ft)
- Highest elevation: 193 m (633 ft)
- Lowest elevation: 144 m (472 ft)
- Population (2023): 350
  - Density: 34/km^{2} (87/sq mi)
- Time zone: UTC+01:00 (CET)
  - Summer (DST): UTC+02:00 (CEST)
- INSEE/Postal code: 61129 /61400
- ^{1} French Land Register data, which excludes lakes, ponds, glaciers > 1 km^{2} (0.386 sq mi or 247 acres) and river estuaries.

Courgeon (French pronunciation: [kuʁʒɔ̃]) is a commune in the Orne department in north-western part of France.

== Geography ==
The commune is made up of the following collection of villages and hamlets, Coulier, Le Bois Rouelle, Courgeon, La Pigeardière and La Charonnière.

La Vilette and La Chippe rivers flow through the commune.

== Points of interest ==
=== National heritage sites ===
- Notre-Dame Church a seventeenth century church, it was registered as a Monument historique 1909.

== See also ==
- Communes of the Orne department
