= Maucourt-sur-Orne =

- Commune
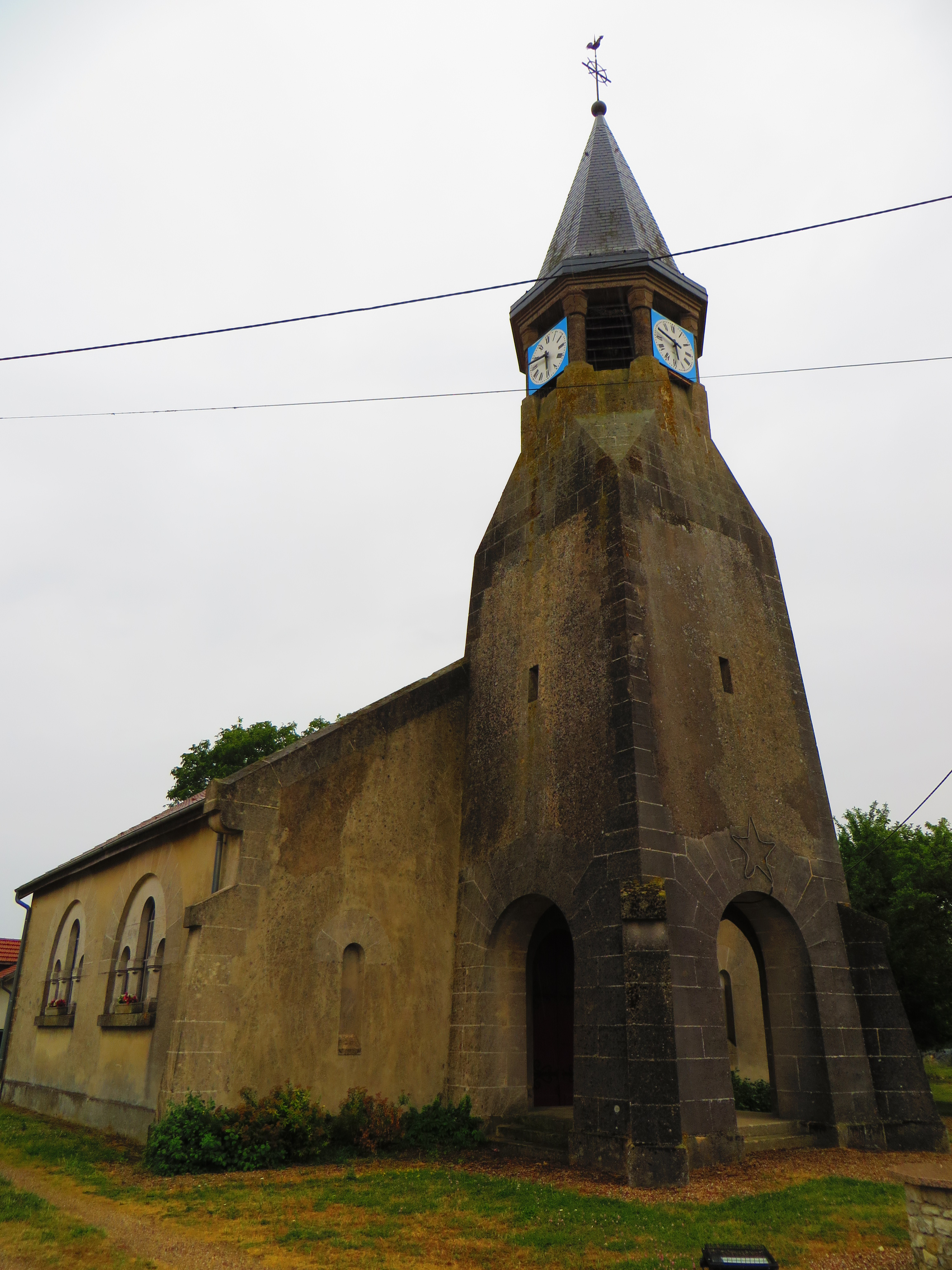
- The church in Maucourt-sur-Orne
- Location of Maucourt-sur-Orne
- Location within France Location within Grand Est
- Coordinates: 49°14′58″N 5°30′35″E
- Country: France
- Region: Grand Est
- Department: Meuse
- Arrondissement: Verdun
- Canton: Belleville-sur-Meuse
- Intercommunality: CC du pays d'Étain

Government
  - Mayor (2020–2026): Vincent Saidani
- Area^{1}: 6.43 km^{2} (2.48 sq mi)
- Elevation: 236 m (774 ft)
- Highest elevation: 253 m (830 ft)
- Lowest elevation: 212 m (696 ft)
- Population (2023): 51
  - Density: 7.9/km^{2} (21/sq mi)
- Time zone: UTC+01:00 (CET)
  - Summer (DST): UTC+02:00 (CEST)
- INSEE/Postal code: 55325 /55400
- ^{1} French Land Register data, which excludes lakes, ponds, glaciers > 1 km^{2} (0.386 sq mi or 247 acres) and river estuaries.

Maucourt-sur-Orne (French pronunciation: [mokuʁ syʁ ɔʁn], literally Maucourt on Orne) is a commune in the Meuse department in Grand Est in north-eastern France.

== See also ==
- Communes of the Meuse department
