= Saint-Remy-la-Calonne =

Saint-Rémy-la-Calonne
- Commune
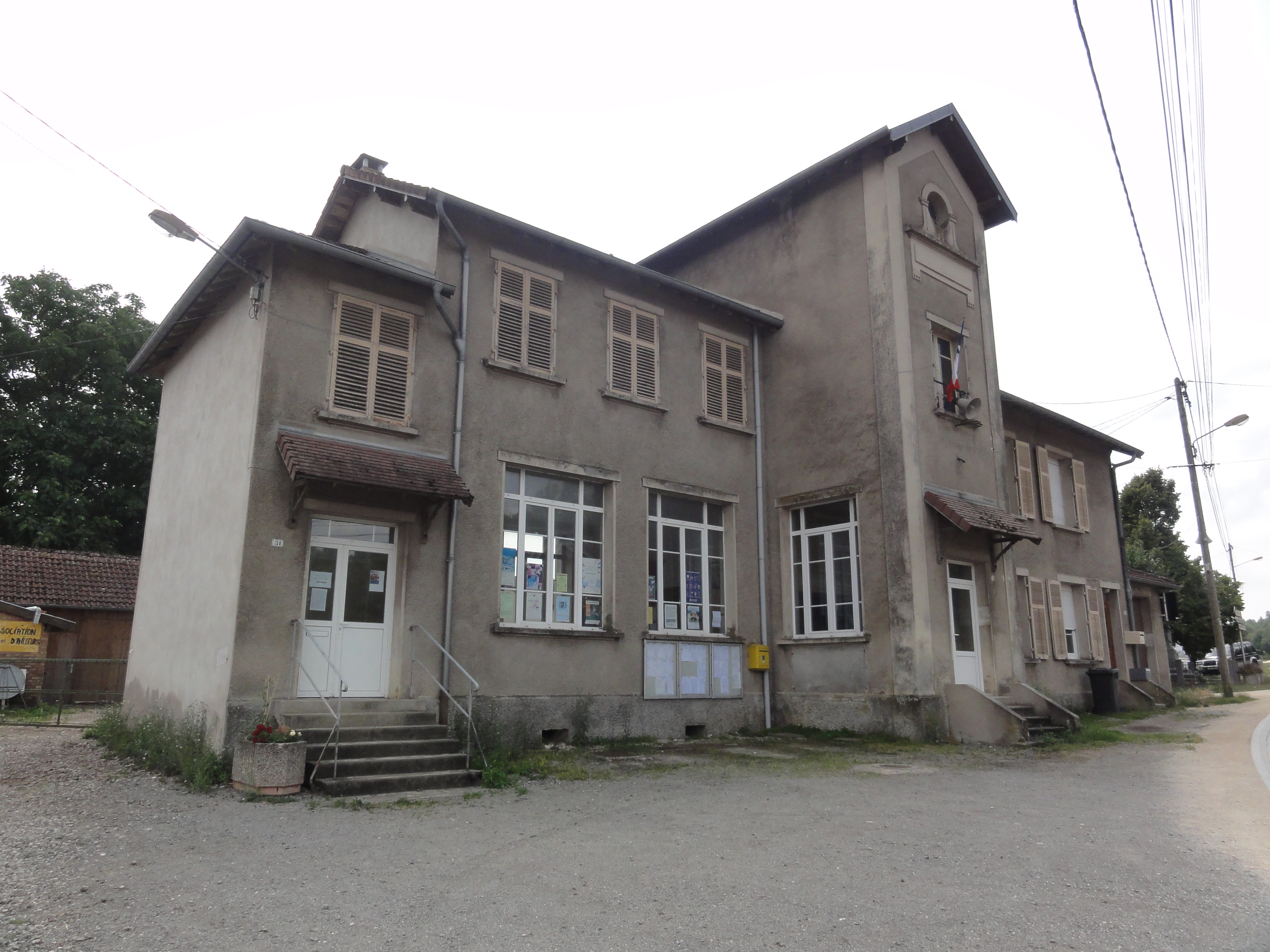
- The town hall in Saint-Remy-la-Calonne

- Coat of arms
- Location of Saint-Rémy-la-Calonne
- Location within France Location within Grand Est
- Coordinates: 49°02′51″N 5°36′08″E
- Country: France
- Region: Grand Est
- Department: Meuse
- Arrondissement: Verdun
- Canton: Étain
- Intercommunality: Territoire de Fresnes-en-Woëvre

Government
  - Mayor (2020–2026): Daniel Breton
- Area^{1}: 8.04 km^{2} (3.10 sq mi)
- Elevation: 290 m (950 ft)
- Highest elevation: 384 m (1,260 ft)
- Lowest elevation: 273 m (896 ft)
- Population (2023): 97
  - Density: 12/km^{2} (31/sq mi)
- Time zone: UTC+01:00 (CET)
  - Summer (DST): UTC+02:00 (CEST)
- INSEE/Postal code: 55465 /55160
- ^{1} French Land Register data, which excludes lakes, ponds, glaciers > 1 km^{2} (0.386 sq mi or 247 acres) and river estuaries.

Saint-Remy-la-Calonne (French pronunciation: [sɛ̃ ʁemi la kalɔn]) is a commune in the Meuse department in Grand Est in north-eastern France.

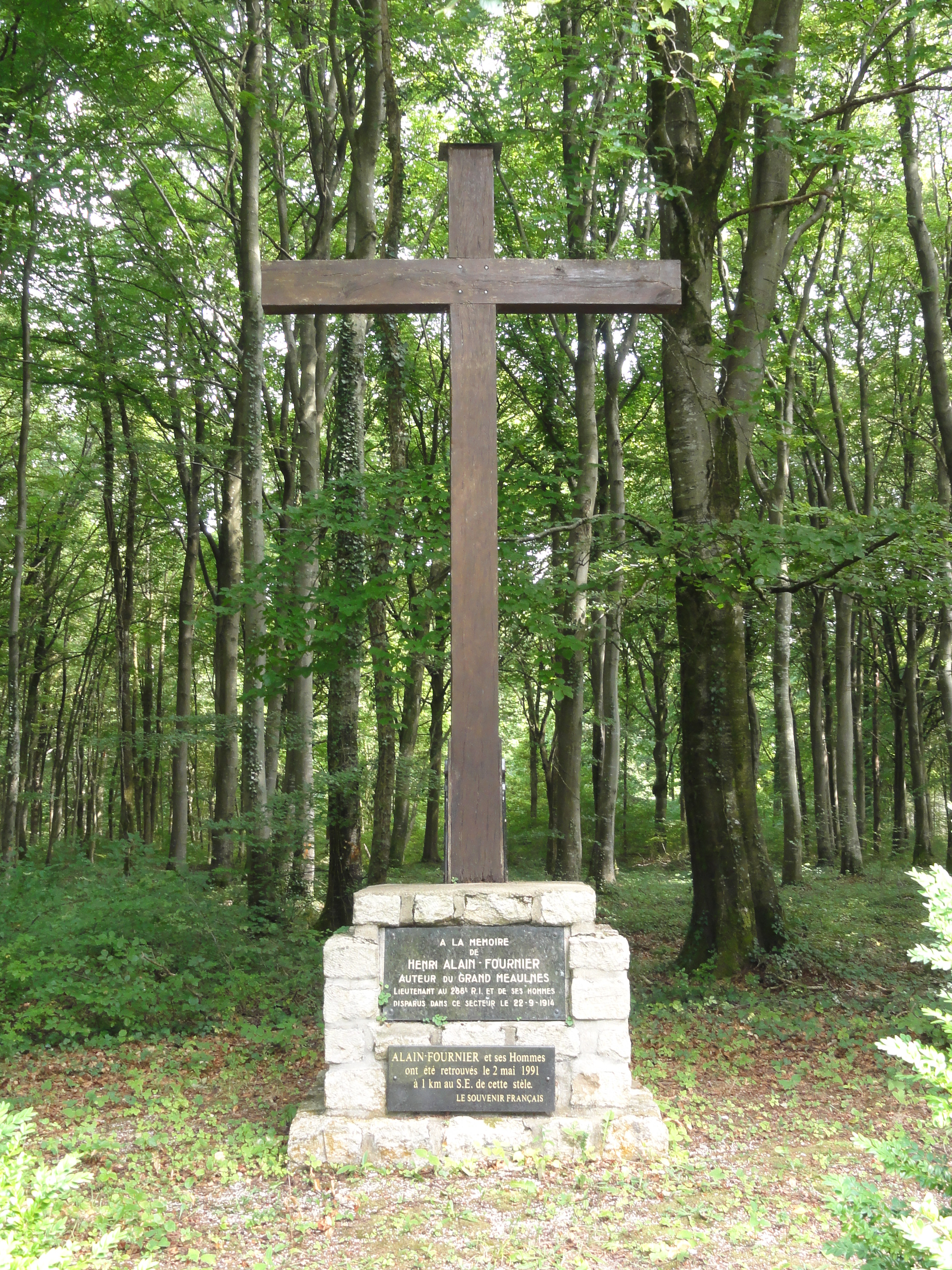
A cross honoring Alain Fournier in the cemetery at Saint-Remy-la-Calonne

The author Alain-Fournier, who died in 1914, was buried in the cemetery here after his body was identified in 1991. The main street through the village is known as Rue Alain Fournier in his honor.

== See also ==
- Communes of the Meuse department
- Parc naturel régional de Lorraine
