= René Dorme =

French WWI pilot

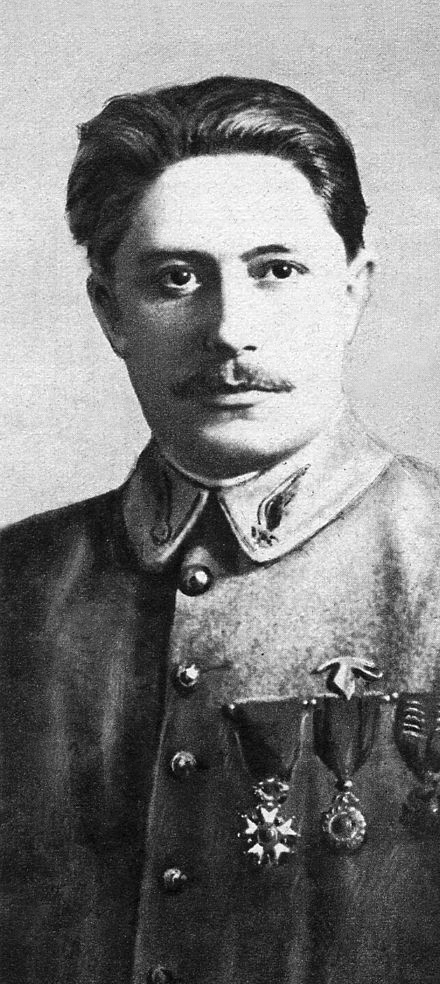
- Born: 30 January 1894; Abaucourt les Souppleville, France
- Died: 25 May 1917 (aged 23); South east of Reims (probably north of Nauroy), France
- Military career
- Allegiance: France
- Branch: Air Service
- Rank: Sous lieutenant
- Nicknames: "Père" (Father), "Inimitable" (Unmatchable), "Increvable" (Indefatigable/Tireless).
- Units: Escadrille 94; Escadrille 95; Escadrille 3
- Awards: Chevalier de la Légion d'honneur Médaille militaire Croix de Guerre (with 11 palms); Grande Médaille d'Or de l'Aéro-Club de France

Sous Lieutenant René Pierre Marie Dorme (30 January 1894 – 25 May 1917), Légion d'honneur, Médaille militaire, Croix de Guerre was a French World War I fighter ace credited with at least confirmed 23 victories.

== Biography ==
René Pierre Marie Dorme was born in Abaucourt les Souppleville, France on 30 January 1894.

He joined the military in 1913, and was serving as a cannoneer in Tunisia, North Africa when World War I erupted. Requesting transfer to aviation duty, he began training as an aerial observer on 1 February 1915. On the 13th, those orders were changed to ship him to pilot training. On 6 May 1915, he graduated with his Military Pilot's Brevet. After advanced schooling, he was posted to Escadrille 94 on 5 June 1915.

He was injured in a crash before he saw action. He did not get into combat until March 1916. He was posted to Escadrille 3 to fly Nieuport fighters in June 1916. Although he would later change from his Nieuport 17 to a SPAD VII, in both cases he adorned his aircraft with a Cross of Lorraine on the upper deck, the numeral '12' accompanying a stork on the fuselage, and the nickname 'Papa Dorne' on the side of the cockpit.

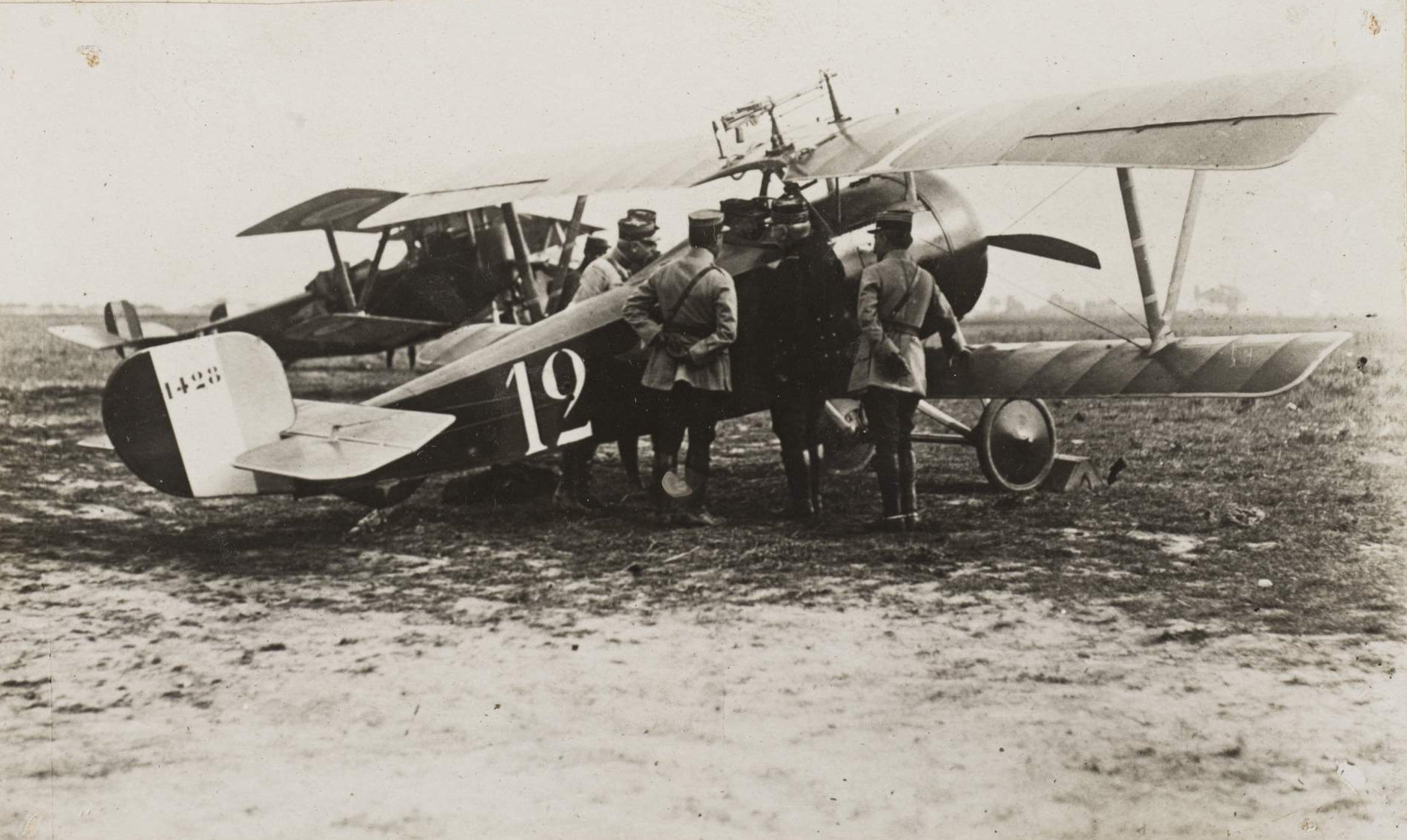
Marshal Joseph Joffre congratulates Dorme alongside his Nieuport 17 during the Battle of the Somme in 1916.

Dorme scored 23 confirmed victories between July 1916 and May 1917, with approximately the same number of combat claims unconfirmed. During this victory string, Dorme was awarded the Médaille Militaire on 4 August 1916, and the Legion d'honneur on 18 October 1916. He was gravely wounded in action on 20 December 1916. While in hospital recuperating, he was commissioned as a Sous lieutenant on 23 January 1917. He returned to flying duty on 1 March 1917. He died in combat on 25 May 1917, when the German ace Heinrich Kroll of Jagdstaffel 9 shot him down. Kroll, who was flying an Albatros D.III, noted in his diary that Dorme had fought from 5,300 metres (17,400 feet) down to 800 metres (2,600 feet) before his aircraft dived into the ground and burst into flames. Kroll also noted that Dorme was identified by his watch, which was found on his remains.

Dorme had 23 aerial victories officially confirmed. Unconfirmed claims amount to 19 more listings. Dorme was notoriously lax in filing combat claims, sometimes only doing so when prompted by wingmates. The haphazardness of his victory list has led to speculation that he scored as many as 43 victories, or perhaps even 70 victories.

== Honors and awards ==
- Médaille Militaire

Citation: "Pilot of remarkable skill, sang-froid, and audacity. Has accomplished numerous flights at night under the most difficult and dangerous conditions. Has had ten aerial combats during the course of which he downed an enemy plane on 3 April, and a second one on 9 Jul 1916. The latter within fifteen kilometers [9.3 miles] of French lines. Already wounded and cited in orders."

- Legion d'honneur

Citation: "Brilliant pursuit pilot. Has exceptional knowledge and audacity. Always ready at all times and in all circumstances to carry out the boldest of missions. Has accomplished superb reconnaissances and downed thirteen enemy planes. Has the Médaille Militaire and five citations in army orders."
