= Abaucourt-Hautecourt =

- Commune
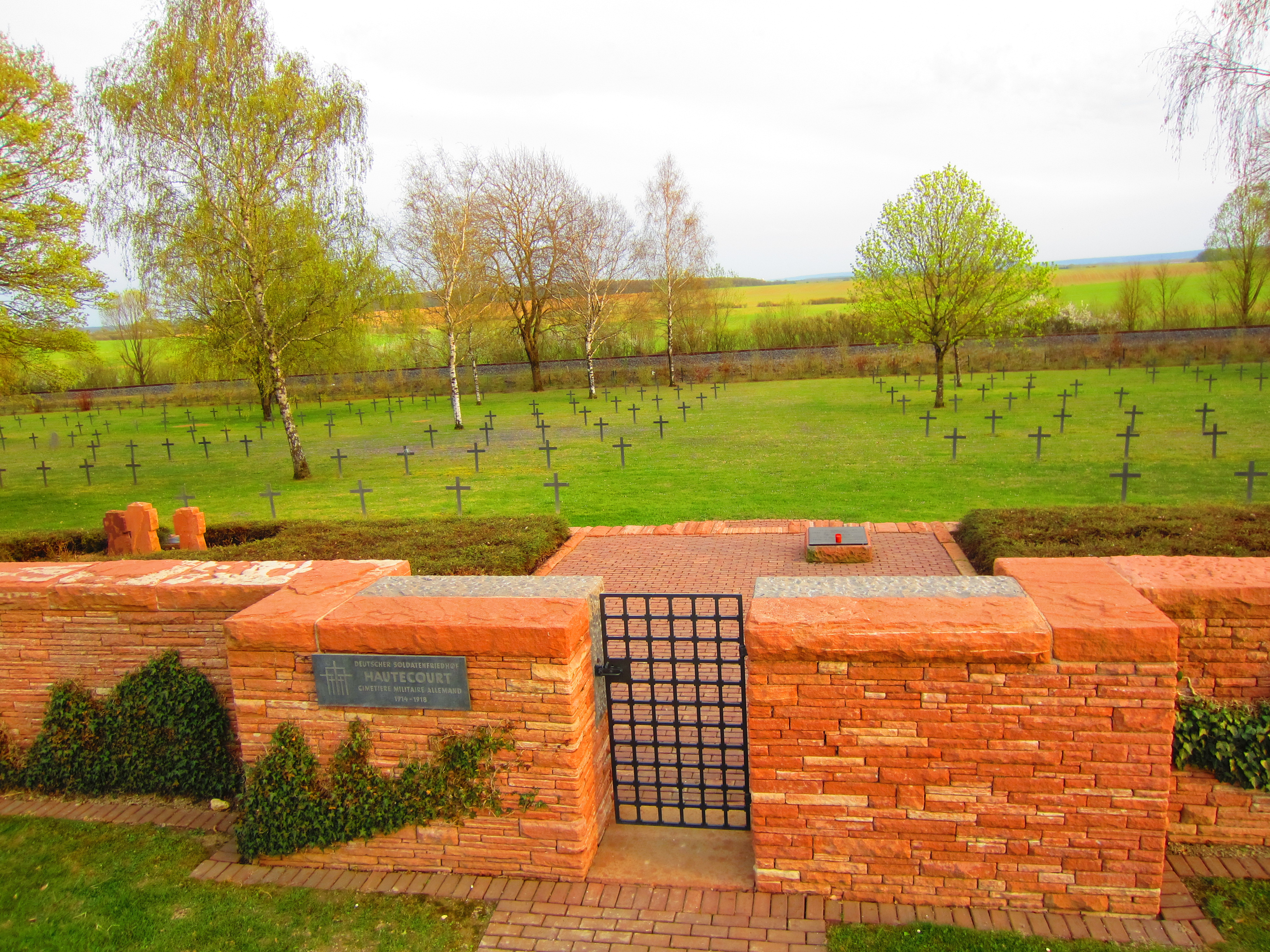
- German Military cemetery
- Location of Abaucourt-Hautecourt
- Location within France Location within Grand Est
- Coordinates: 49°11′49″N 5°32′26″E
- Country: France
- Region: Grand Est
- Department: Meuse
- Arrondissement: Verdun
- Canton: Belleville-sur-Meuse
- Intercommunality: Pays d'Étain

Government
  - Mayor (2020–2026): Jean-Marie Mittaux
- Area^{1}: 9.68 km^{2} (3.74 sq mi)
- Elevation: 233 m (764 ft)
- Highest elevation: 251 m (823 ft)
- Lowest elevation: 210 m (690 ft)
- Population (2023): 101
  - Density: 10.4/km^{2} (27.0/sq mi)
- Demonym(s): Abaucourtois, Abaucourtoises
- Time zone: UTC+01:00 (CET)
  - Summer (DST): UTC+02:00 (CEST)
- INSEE/Postal code: 55002 /55400
- ^{1} French Land Register data, which excludes lakes, ponds, glaciers > 1 km^{2} (0.386 sq mi or 247 acres) and river estuaries.

Abaucourt-Hautecourt (French pronunciation: [abokuʁ otkuʁ]) is a commune in the Meuse department in the Grand Est region of north-eastern France.

== Geography ==
Abbaucourt-Hautecourt is located on the Highway D603 which transects the commune from south-east to north-east about 8 km north-east of Verdun. Highway D114 also transects the commune from north to south. Both Highways intersect in the village of Abaucourt. The commune consists entirely of farmland.

=== Villages and Hamlets ===
- Broville: north of the D603.
- Eix-Abaucourt a small row of houses on the south side of the D603 midway between Eix and the village of Abaucourt.
- Hautecourt south of the D603.

== History ==
In the 1970s, Abaucourt-lès-Souppleville joined Hautecourt-lès-Broville to form a new joint commune called "Abaucourt-Hautecourt".

== Administration ==
List of Successive Mayors of Abaucourt-Hautecort

From	To	Name
1989	2001	Jean Schlemer
2001	2014	Marcel Picard
2014	Current	Jean-Marie Mittaux

== Population ==
The inhabitants of the commune are known as Abaucourtois or Abaucourtoises in French. Population data refer to the area corresponding with the commune as of January 2025.

Historical population
Year	Pop.	±% p.a.
1968	126	—
1975	118	−0.93%
1982	100	−2.34%
1990	112	+1.43%
1999	111	−0.10%
2007	101	−1.17%
2012	110	+1.72%
2017	107	−0.55%
2023	101	−0.96%
Source: INSEE

== Sites and Monuments ==
- German Military Cemetery No. 7885 (1914-1918)
- War Memorial

== Religious Buildings ==
The commune does not have a church.

== Notable people linked to the Commune ==
- Lieutenant René Dorme, a famous aviator of the First World War.

== See also ==
- Communes of the Meuse department
