= Belleville-sur-Meuse =

- Commune
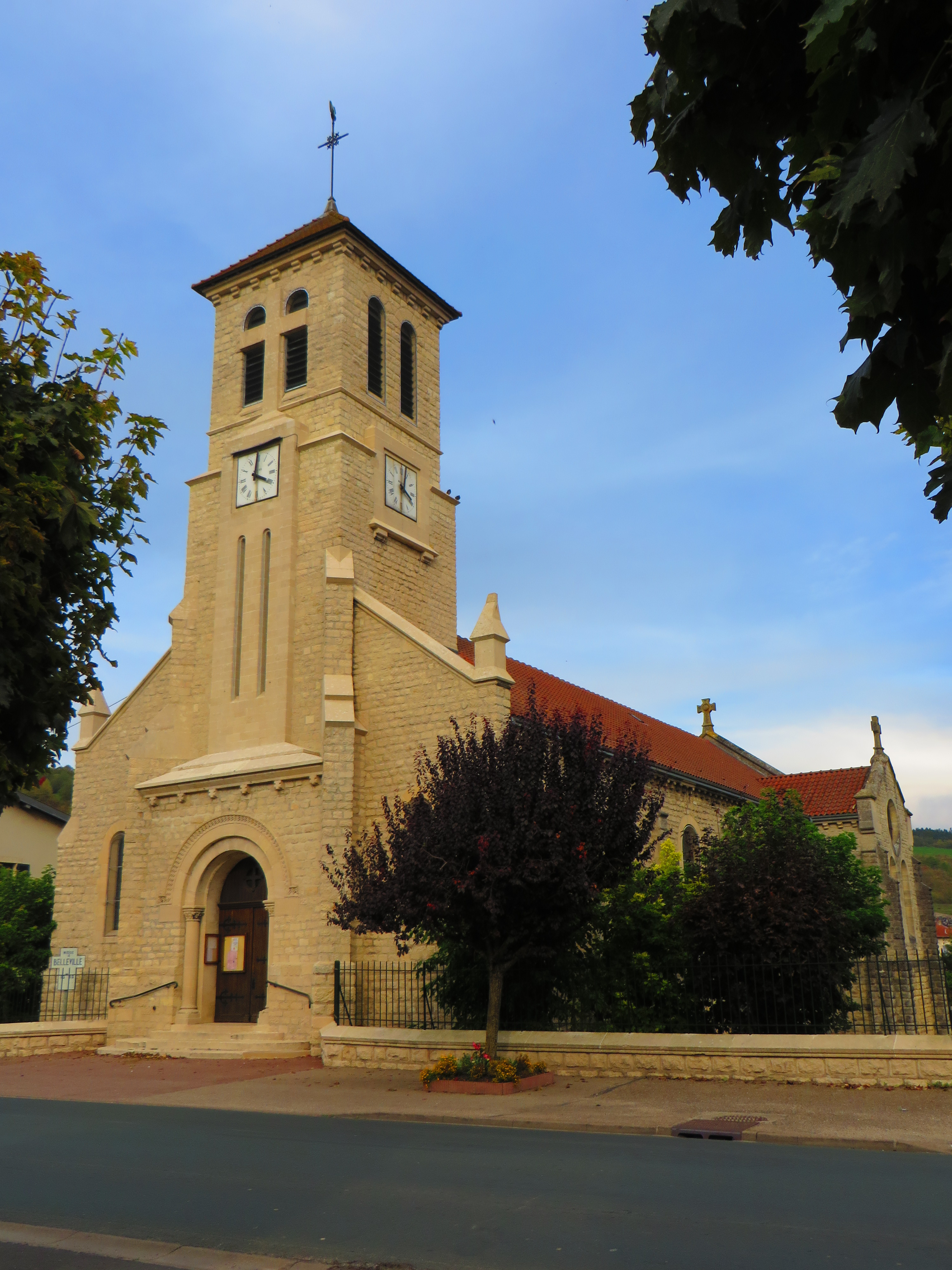
- The church in Belleville-sur-Meuse
- Location of Belleville-sur-Meuse
- Location within France Location within Grand Est
- Coordinates: 49°10′37″N 5°22′52″E
- Country: France
- Region: Grand Est
- Department: Meuse
- Arrondissement: Verdun
- Canton: Belleville-sur-Meuse
- Intercommunality: CA Grand Verdun

Government
  - Mayor (2020–2026): Yves Peltier
- Area^{1}: 10.16 km^{2} (3.92 sq mi)
- Elevation: 190 m (620 ft)
- Highest elevation: 376 m (1,234 ft)
- Lowest elevation: 191 m (627 ft)
- Population (2023): 3,013
  - Density: 296.6/km^{2} (768.1/sq mi)
- Time zone: UTC+01:00 (CET)
  - Summer (DST): UTC+02:00 (CEST)
- INSEE/Postal code: 55043 /55430
- ^{1} French Land Register data, which excludes lakes, ponds, glaciers > 1 km^{2} (0.386 sq mi or 247 acres) and river estuaries.

Belleville-sur-Meuse (French pronunciation: [bɛlvil syʁ møz], lit. 'Belleville on Meuse') is a commune in the Meuse department in the Grand Est region in northeastern France.

== Population ==
Historical population
Year	Pop.	±% p.a.
1968	3,408	—
1975	3,060	−1.53%
1982	2,729	−1.62%
1990	3,163	+1.86%
1999	3,137	−0.09%
2007	3,082	−0.22%
2012	3,205	+0.79%
2017	3,092	−0.72%
2023	3,013	−0.43%
Source: INSEE

== See also ==
- Communes of the Meuse department
