= Gincrey =

- Commune
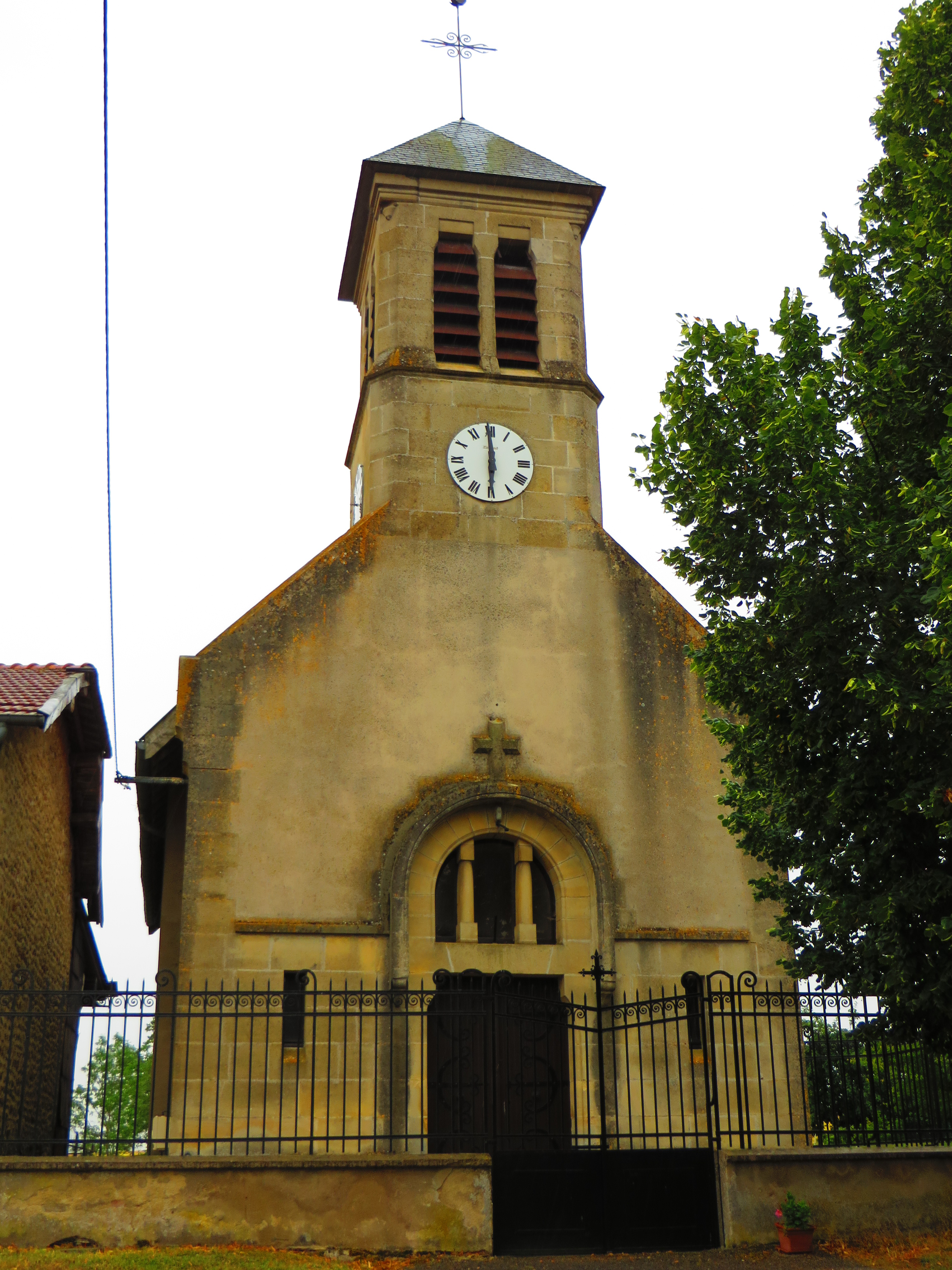
- The church in Gincrey

- Coat of arms
- Location of Gincrey
- Location within France Location within Grand Est
- Coordinates: 49°14′45″N 5°34′23″E
- Country: France
- Region: Grand Est
- Department: Meuse
- Arrondissement: Verdun
- Canton: Belleville-sur-Meuse
- Intercommunality: CC du pays d'Étain

Government
  - Mayor (2020–2026): Michel Debeux
- Area^{1}: 9.69 km^{2} (3.74 sq mi)
- Elevation: 217 m (712 ft)
- Highest elevation: 233 m (764 ft)
- Lowest elevation: 209 m (686 ft)
- Population (2023): 61
  - Density: 6.3/km^{2} (16/sq mi)
- Time zone: UTC+01:00 (CET)
  - Summer (DST): UTC+02:00 (CEST)
- INSEE/Postal code: 55211 /55400
- ^{1} French Land Register data, which excludes lakes, ponds, glaciers > 1 km^{2} (0.386 sq mi or 247 acres) and river estuaries.

Gincrey (French pronunciation: [ʒɛ̃kʁɛ]) is a commune in the Meuse department in Grand Est in north-eastern France.

== See also ==
- Communes of the Meuse department
