= Moulainville =

- Commune
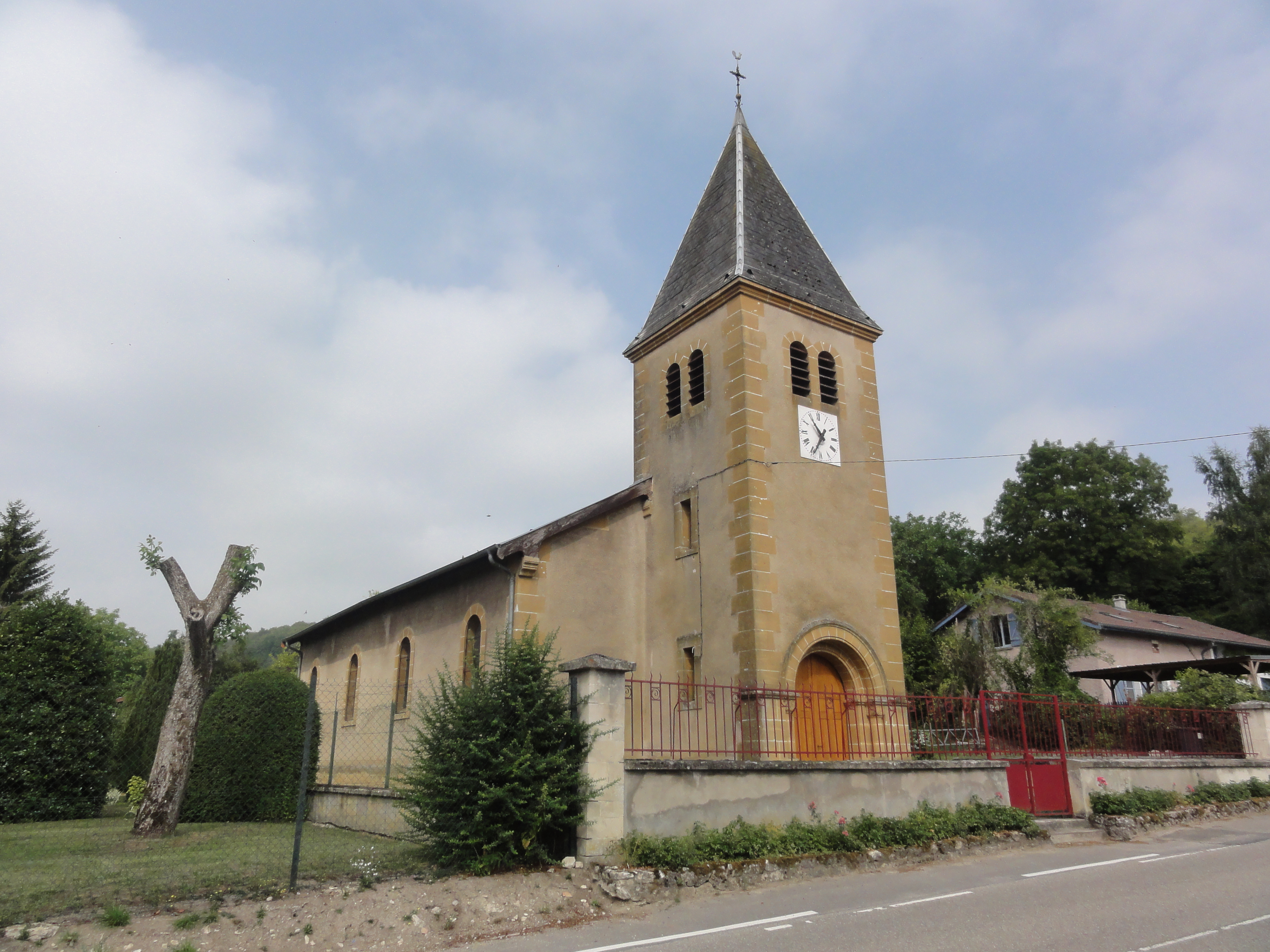
- The church in Moulainville
- Location of Moulainville
- Location within France Location within Grand Est
- Coordinates: 49°09′46″N 5°29′46″E
- Country: France
- Region: Grand Est
- Department: Meuse
- Arrondissement: Verdun
- Canton: Belleville-sur-Meuse
- Intercommunality: CC du pays d'Étain

Government
  - Mayor (2020–2026): Bernadette Dobin
- Area^{1}: 11.15 km^{2} (4.31 sq mi)
- Elevation: 250 m (820 ft)
- Highest elevation: 373 m (1,224 ft)
- Lowest elevation: 225 m (738 ft)
- Population (2023): 139
  - Density: 12.5/km^{2} (32.3/sq mi)
- Time zone: UTC+01:00 (CET)
  - Summer (DST): UTC+02:00 (CEST)
- INSEE/Postal code: 55361 /55400
- ^{1} French Land Register data, which excludes lakes, ponds, glaciers > 1 km^{2} (0.386 sq mi or 247 acres) and river estuaries.

Moulainville (French pronunciation: [mulɛ̃vil]) is a commune in the Meuse department in Grand Est in north-eastern France.

== See also ==
- Communes of the Meuse department
