= Blanzée =

- Commune
- Location of Blanzée
- Location within France Location within Grand Est
- Coordinates: 49°09′37″N 5°32′19″E
- Country: France
- Region: Grand Est
- Department: Meuse
- Arrondissement: Verdun
- Canton: Belleville-sur-Meuse
- Intercommunality: Pays d'Étain

Government
  - Mayor (2020–2026): Alain Bazin
- Area^{1}: 3.39 km^{2} (1.31 sq mi)
- Elevation: 228 m (748 ft)
- Highest elevation: 259 m (850 ft)
- Lowest elevation: 220 m (720 ft)
- Population (2023): 12
  - Density: 3.5/km^{2} (9.2/sq mi)
- Time zone: UTC+01:00 (CET)
  - Summer (DST): UTC+02:00 (CEST)
- INSEE/Postal code: 55055 /55400
- ^{1} French Land Register data, which excludes lakes, ponds, glaciers > 1 km^{2} (0.386 sq mi or 247 acres) and river estuaries.

Blanzée (French pronunciation: [blɑ̃ze]) is a commune in the Meuse department in Grand Est in northeastern France.

== Population ==
Historical population
Year	Pop.	±% p.a.
1968	19	—
1975	22	+2.12%
1982	19	−2.07%
1990	22	+1.85%
1999	18	−2.21%
2007	19	+0.68%
2012	19	+0.00%
2017	16	−3.38%
2023	12	−4.68%
Source: INSEE

== See also ==
- Communes of the Meuse department
