= Canton of Belleville-sur-Meuse =

Coordinates: 49.18°N 5.38°E

The canton of Belleville-sur-Meuse is an administrative division of the Meuse department, northeastern France. It was created at the French canton reorganisation which came into effect in March 2015. Its seat is in Belleville-sur-Meuse. It includes the six "destroyed villages", which were depopulated in the Battle of Verdun during World War I.

It consists of the following communes:

1. Abaucourt-Hautecourt
2. Beaumont-en-Verdunois
3. Belleville-sur-Meuse
4. Bezonvaux
5. Blanzée
6. Bras-sur-Meuse
7. Champneuville
8. Charny-sur-Meuse
9. Châtillon-sous-les-Côtes
10. Cumières-le-Mort-Homme
11. Damloup
12. Dieppe-sous-Douaumont
13. Douaumont-Vaux
14. Eix
15. Fleury-devant-Douaumont
16. Gincrey
17. Grimaucourt-en-Woëvre
18. Haumont-près-Samogneux
19. Louvemont-Côte-du-Poivre
20. Maucourt-sur-Orne
21. Mogeville
22. Moranville
23. Moulainville
24. Ornes
25. Samogneux
26. Thierville-sur-Meuse
27. Vacherauville
