= Frank Davison (translator) =

British translator

Frank Davison was a British translator. He is best known for his translation of Alain-Fournier's classic novel Le Grand Meaulnes under the title The Lost Domain. This translation, first published by Oxford University Press in 1959, has remained in print ever since. It is the "classic" translation of the work, praised for its "fine literary English." A review by L.A. Brisson in French Studies called Davison's translation of Alain-Fournier's Le Grand Meaulnes "reussit à merveille" – "wonderfully successful".

== Translations ==
- The Lost Domain (1959)
- Le Grand Meaulnes and other books by Henri Alain-Fournier, Frank Davison (Translator)
