= Vaux-lès-Palameix =

- Commune
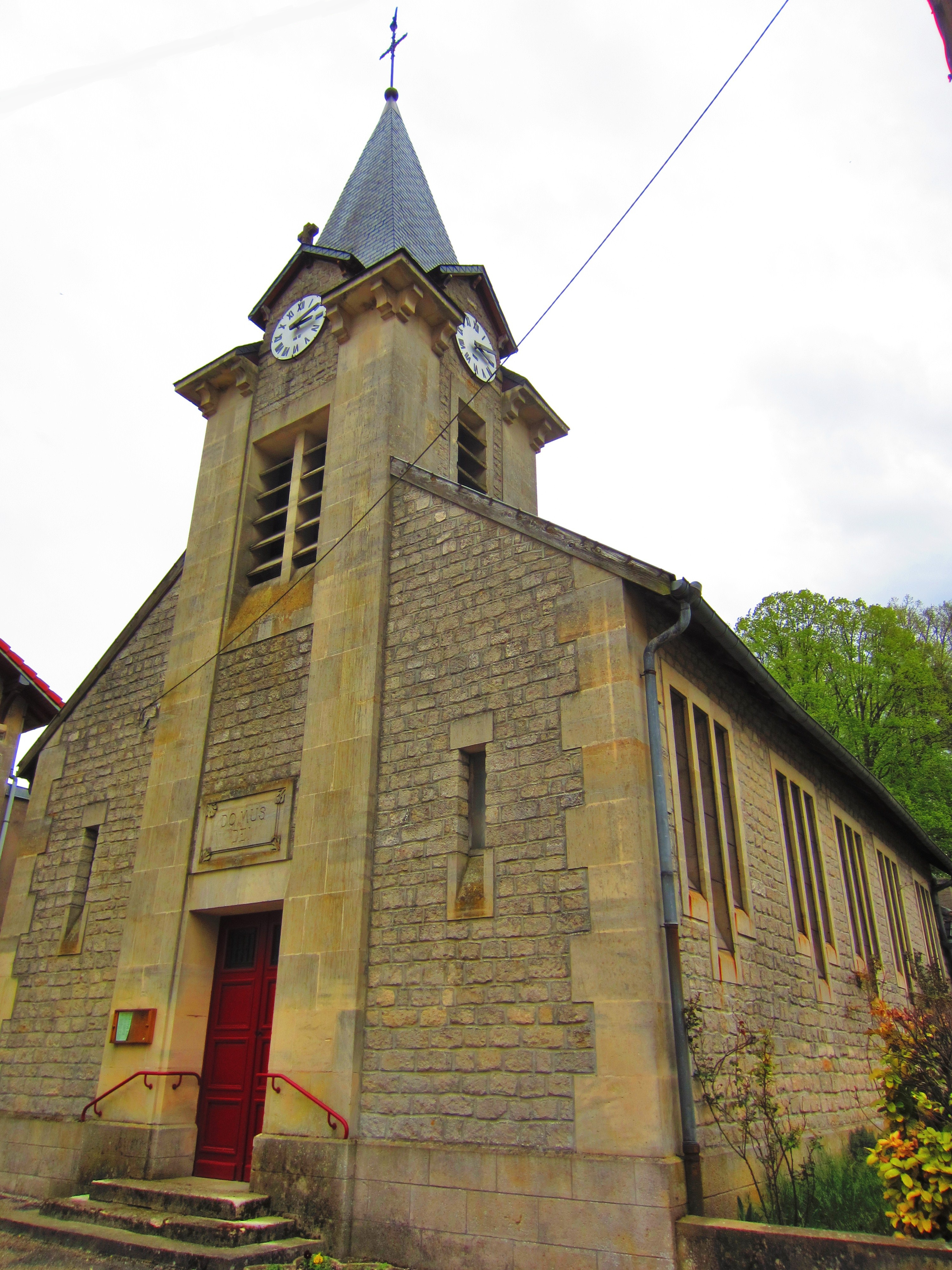
- The church of Saint Saintin in Vaux-lès-Palameix

- Coat of arms
- Location of Vaux-lès-Palameix
- Location within France Location within Grand Est
- Coordinates: 49°01′09″N 5°32′23″E
- Country: France
- Region: Grand Est
- Department: Meuse
- Arrondissement: Commercy
- Canton: Saint-Mihiel
- Intercommunality: CC du Sammiellois

Government
  - Mayor (2020–2026): Jean-Pierre Vogrig
- Area^{1}: 10.52 km^{2} (4.06 sq mi)
- Elevation: 261 m (856 ft)
- Highest elevation: 377 m (1,237 ft)
- Lowest elevation: 237 m (778 ft)
- Population (2023): 57
  - Density: 5.4/km^{2} (14/sq mi)
- Time zone: UTC+01:00 (CET)
  - Summer (DST): UTC+02:00 (CEST)
- INSEE/Postal code: 55540 /55300
- ^{1} French Land Register data, which excludes lakes, ponds, glaciers > 1 km^{2} (0.386 sq mi or 247 acres) and river estuaries.

Vaux-lès-Palameix (French pronunciation: [vo lɛ palamɛ]) is a commune in the Meuse department in Grand Est in north-eastern France.

== See also ==
- Communes of the Meuse department
- Parc naturel régional de Lorraine
