= Mogeville =

- Commune
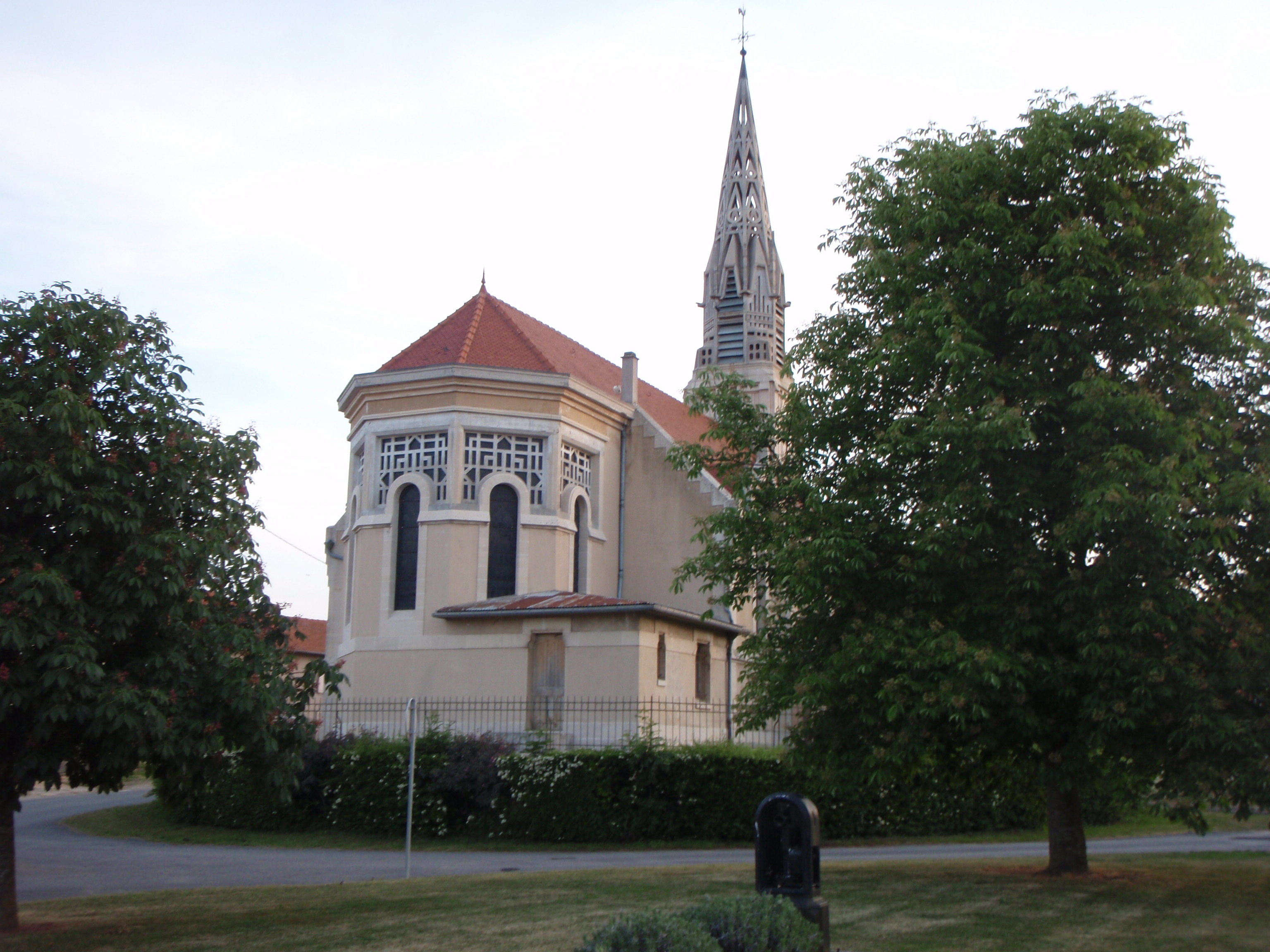
- The church in Mogeville
- Location of Mogeville
- Location within France Location within Grand Est
- Coordinates: 49°14′35″N 5°31′51″E
- Country: France
- Region: Grand Est
- Department: Meuse
- Arrondissement: Verdun
- Canton: Belleville-sur-Meuse
- Intercommunality: CC du pays d'Étain

Government
  - Mayor (2020–2026): Emeric Hablot
- Area^{1}: 6.37 km^{2} (2.46 sq mi)
- Elevation: 234 m (768 ft)
- Highest elevation: 237 m (778 ft)
- Lowest elevation: 211 m (692 ft)
- Population (2023): 73
  - Density: 11/km^{2} (30/sq mi)
- Time zone: UTC+01:00 (CET)
  - Summer (DST): UTC+02:00 (CEST)
- INSEE/Postal code: 55339 /55400
- ^{1} French Land Register data, which excludes lakes, ponds, glaciers > 1 km^{2} (0.386 sq mi or 247 acres) and river estuaries.

Mogeville (French pronunciation: [mɔʒvil]) is a commune in the Meuse department in Grand Est in north-eastern France.

== See also ==
- Communes of the Meuse department
