= Albin Schram =

Albin Schram (1926–2005) was one of the greatest collectors of autograph letters by shapers of world history. He was born in Prague to Austrian parents. He studied law at Vienna University and worked in Vienna, Germany and Switzerland. After the annexation of Czechoslovakia, he was conscripted into the Wehrmacht in 1943.

Schram was a voracious collector of letters, owning manuscripts written by literary, historical, musical, political and scientific figures across 500 years. He was a wealthy Austrian banker who pursued his hobby from his mansion in Lausanne, Switzerland. The letters were kept in a filing cabinet adjoining the laundry in the basement of the house.

He is said to have collected some 1000 letters, written by royals, scientists, writers and philosophers. They date between the 15th and 20th Centuries, and represent a broad range of countries and languages.

== Sources ==
- Daily Telegraph, Monday 6 June 2007 - One filing cabinet held 500 years of history
- Filing cabinet in Lausanne opens its secrets
- Letter collection goes under the hammer
- THE ALBIN SCHRAM COLLECTION OF AUTOGRAPHED LETTERS, Sale 7411
