= Moranville, Meuse =

Moranville
- Commune
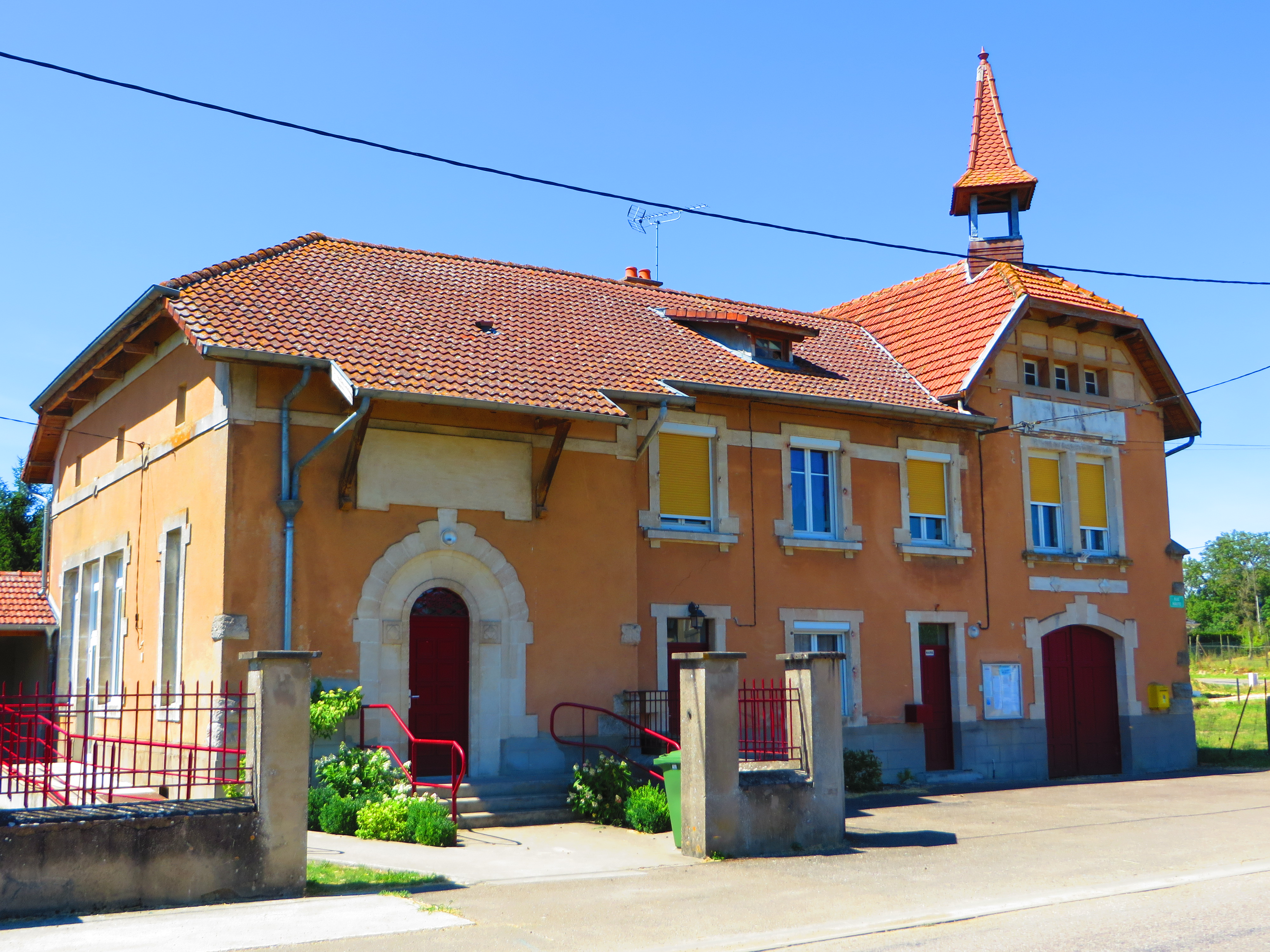
- The town hall in Moranville

- Coat of arms
- Location of Moranville
- Location within France Location within Grand Est
- Coordinates: 49°10′30″N 5°32′48″E
- Country: France
- Region: Grand Est
- Department: Meuse
- Arrondissement: Verdun
- Canton: Belleville-sur-Meuse
- Intercommunality: CC du pays d'Étain

Government
  - Mayor (2020–2026): Régis Lang
- Area^{1}: 6.8 km^{2} (2.6 sq mi)
- Elevation: 218 m (715 ft)
- Highest elevation: 246 m (807 ft)
- Lowest elevation: 212 m (696 ft)
- Population (2023): 103
  - Density: 15/km^{2} (39/sq mi)
- Time zone: UTC+01:00 (CET)
  - Summer (DST): UTC+02:00 (CEST)
- INSEE/Postal code: 55356 /55400
- ^{1} French Land Register data, which excludes lakes, ponds, glaciers > 1 km^{2} (0.386 sq mi or 247 acres) and river estuaries.

Moranville (French pronunciation: [mɔʁɑ̃vil]) is a commune in the Meuse department in Grand Est in north-eastern France.

== See also ==
- Communes of the Meuse department
