= Eix =

- Commune
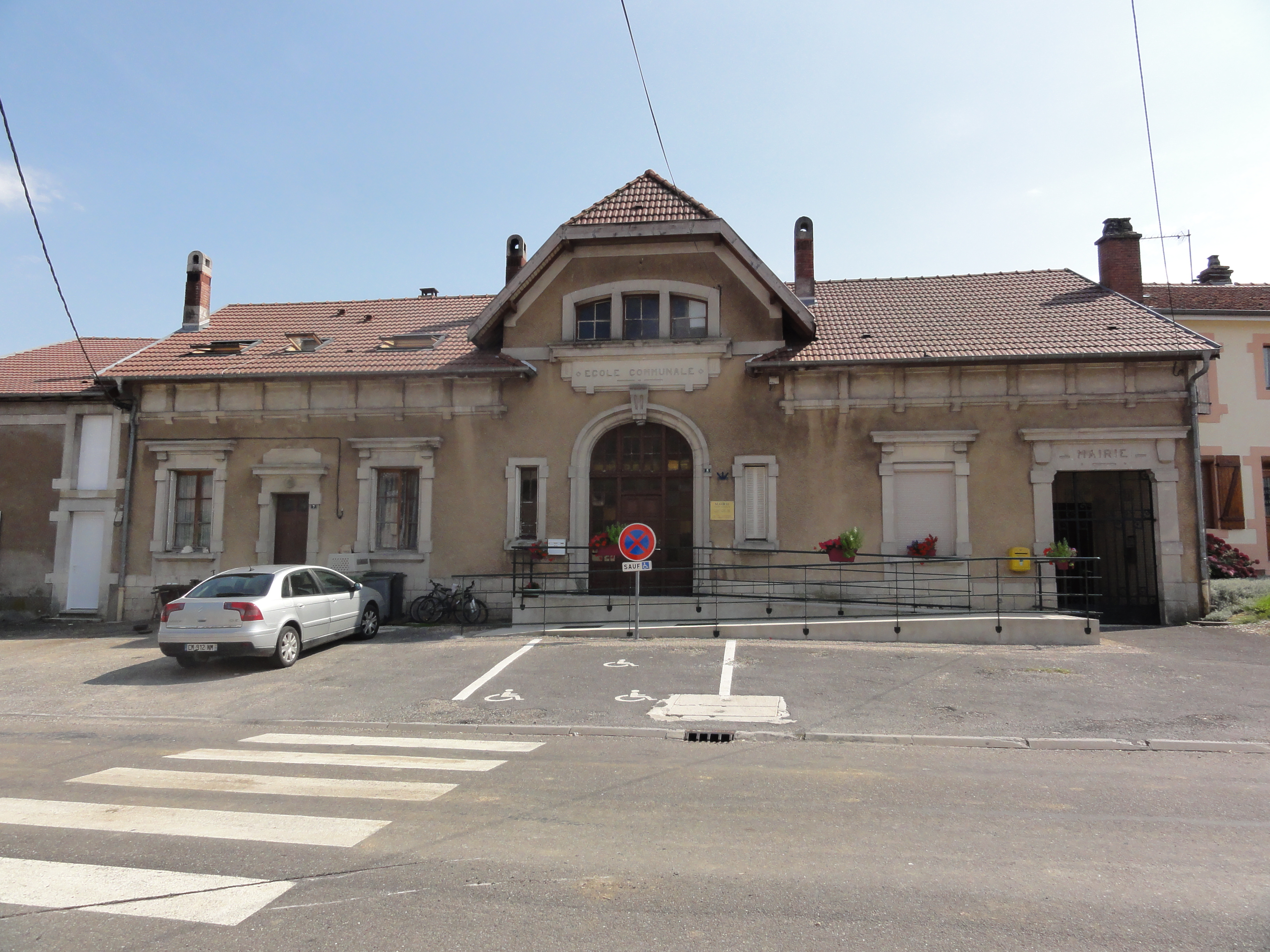
- The town hall in Eix

- Coat of arms
- Location of Eix
- Location within France Location within Grand Est
- Coordinates: 49°10′49″N 5°29′54″E
- Country: France
- Region: Grand Est
- Department: Meuse
- Arrondissement: Verdun
- Canton: Belleville-sur-Meuse
- Intercommunality: Pays d'Étain

Government
  - Mayor (2020–2026): Jean Natale
- Area^{1}: 12.06 km^{2} (4.66 sq mi)
- Elevation: 242 m (794 ft)
- Highest elevation: 366 m (1,201 ft)
- Lowest elevation: 228 m (748 ft)
- Population (2023): 270
  - Density: 22/km^{2} (58/sq mi)
- Time zone: UTC+01:00 (CET)
  - Summer (DST): UTC+02:00 (CEST)
- INSEE/Postal code: 55171 /55400
- ^{1} French Land Register data, which excludes lakes, ponds, glaciers > 1 km^{2} (0.386 sq mi or 247 acres) and river estuaries.

Eix is a commune in the Meuse department in Grand Est in north-eastern France.

== See also ==
- Communes of the Meuse department
