= List of World War I memorials and cemeteries in Verdun =

The French town of Verdun was the site of the Battle of Verdun during the First World War, one of the most costly battles in military history. Since then, cemeteries and memorials have been established for casualties on both sides, as well as for significant individuals and events related to the battle.

== The Douaumont Ossuary ==
The Douaumont Ossuary is a memorial containing the remains of soldiers who died on the battlefield during the Battle of Verdun in World War I. It is located in Douaumont, France, within the Verdun battlefield and has been designated a "nécropole nationale", or "national cemetery".

The ossuary is a memorial containing the remains of both French and German soldiers who died on the Verdun battlefield. Through small outside windows, the skeletal remains of at least 130,000 unidentified soldiers of both nations can be seen filling up alcoves at the lower edge of the building. On the inside of the ossuary, the ceiling and walls are partly covered by plaques bearing names of French soldiers who fell during the Battle of Verdun, as well as the names of those who died fighting during World War II, The First Indochina War and during the Algerian Wars.

In front of the monument, and sloping downhill, lies the largest single French military cemetery of the First World War, with 16,142 graves. It was initiated in 1923 by Verdun veteran André Maginot, who would later create the Maginot Line. The ossuary was officially inaugurated on 7 August 1932 by French President Albert Lebrun.

The architects of the ossuary were Léon Azéma, Max Edrei. Jacques Hardy and George Desvallières designed the stained-glass windows. The tower is 46 metres (151 ft) high and has a panoramic view of the battlefields. The tower contains a bronze death-bell, weighing over 2 tonnes (2.0 long tons; 2.2 short tons), called Bourdon de la Victoire, which is sounded at official ceremonies. It was offered by an American benefactor, Anne Thornburn Van Buren, in 1927. At the top of the tower a rotating red and white "lantern of the dead" shines on the battlefields at night. The cloister is 137 metres (449 ft) long and contains 42 interior alcoves.

Inside the cloister are 18 shelters, each holding two granite tombs, with each of these tombs representing an exact section of the battlefield. Underneath, burial vaults hold the bones of the unidentified dead.

The construction of the ossuary was organized by a committee led by the Bishop of Verdun, who collected subscriptions within France and internationally. Around the exterior of the building are displayed the coats of arms of all the cities that donated money towards its construction. In the gallery below are some further photographs of the ossuary and cemetery.

== Le Soldat du Droit ==
This memorial comprises the sculpture of a reclining soldier, the work being entitled "Le Soldat du Droit" (The Soldier of Justice). It is dedicated to Andre Thomé, a French politician, who was killed at Verdun on 10 March 1916. His parliamentary occupation meant that he was not obliged to serve in the army but he had volunteered nonetheless.

== Monument at Mort Homme and the Monument to the 40th French Infantry ==
The Monument at Mort Homme was the work of the sculptor Jacques Froment-Meurice, and was erected by the veterans of the 69th French Infantry Division. The skeleton of a French soldier is draped over the flag for which he has sacrificed his life. He carries the flame of victory and the monument is inscribed with the words:

"Ils n'ont pas passé"

The inauguration ceremony took place on 10 September 1922, in the presence of Generals Nivelle and Berthelot, Boichut, the Governor of Verdun and Mon. Taufflieb, the senator for the Bas-Rhin, who had commanded the 69th.

100 metres from this monument is the granite monument dedicated to the soldiers of the 40th French Infantry. A photograph is shown in the gallery at the end of the article.

Both monuments stand on Cote 304, a strategically significant piece of high ground contested during the battle. The memorials are dedicated to the more than 10,000 French Soldiers who perished there. The hill was first attacked by the Germans on 20 March 1916 and again on 9 April 1916. Neither of these two attacks were successful. However, on 29 June the Germans took the hill, and less than two months later, the French re-captured it. On the right-hand side of the memorial to the 40th are listed the divisions that fought here in 1916 and on the left are those divisions who fought in 1917, when further fighting took place.

Jacques Froment-Meurice was born in Paris in 1864 and died in 1947. He was a pupil of Chapu. In 1925 he worked on the war memorial at Saumur.

== Memorial to Muslim soldiers ==
This striking memorial is completely white in colour and is dedicated to the 70,000 Muslim soldiers who died whilst fighting for France at Verdun. It was inaugurated on 25 June 2006, the ceremony being led by Jacques Chirac, Michèle Alliot-Marie, the Minister of Defence, Hamlaoui Mekachera, the Secretary of State for Veteran soldiers, Jean-Louis Debré, Christian Poncelet and Dalil Boubakeur. The design of the memorial is inspired by Arab-Muslim art.

== Memorial to 137th Regiment of Infantry/The Bayonet Trench ==
When the battlefield clearance parties began to search the Verdun area after the war, one party found what appeared to be a mass grave of men from one unit, the 137th Infantry Regiment. It was thought that they were killed in their "jumping off" trench when the intense German shelling literally buried them alive. The story was that Father Ratier, an army chaplain, who had been a stretcher bearer with the 137th in 1916, found a line of some thirty nine bayonets protruding from the ground: each one marking the location of a body and here the legend started and the spot is marked by a memorial known as the "Trench of Bayonets"

The monument carries at its front the words

" A la mémoire des soldats français QUI DORMENT DEBOUT LE FUSIL A LA MAIN dans cette tranchée"

The door to the monument in green bronze was the work of Edgar Brandt and leads through to a colonnaded alley.

== Memorial to Fleury-devant-Douaumont ==
Near the Douaumont ossuary is the memorial which remembers the lost village of Fleury-Devant-Douaumont, one of the many villages destroyed in the fighting but never rebuilt. The village had become a key position in the battle and changed hands 16 times and by July 1916 had been razed to the ground. It was never rebuilt and the memorial stands as a reminder of the horrors that the village must have witnessed. Several other villages suffered the fate of Fleury-devant-Douaumont, namely Bezonvaux, Beaumont-en-Verdunois, Haumont-près-Samogneux, Louvemont-Côte-du-Poivre, and Cumières-le-Mort-Homme.

During the war, the town was destroyed and the land was made uninhabitable to such an extent that a decision was made not to rebuild it. The area around the municipality was contaminated by corpses, explosives, and poisonous gas, so farming was impossible. The site of the commune is maintained as a testimony to war and is officially designated as a "village that died for France".

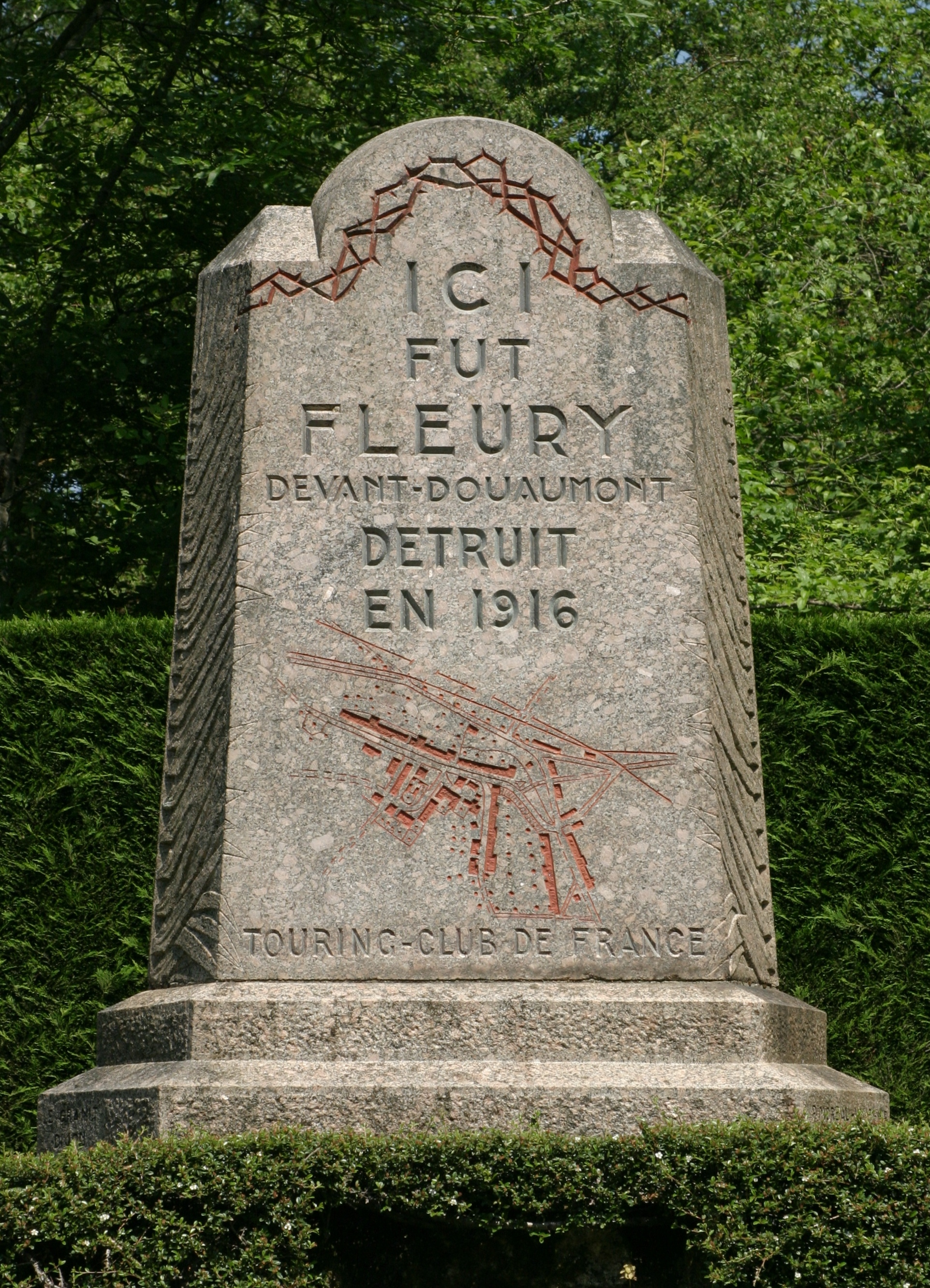
Monument at Fleury

== Mémorial de Verdun ==
Just by the Fleury-devant-Douaumont memorial is the Verdun memorial, a museum, built on the site of Fleury-deviant-Doaumont's old railway station. It was set up in 1967 on the initiative of the CNSV (Comité National du Souvenir de Verdun). It contains many artifacts found in the Verdun trenches and endeavors to tell the story of the daily life of those who fought at Verdun.

Maurice Genevoix, the writer, who fought in the 1914-1918 war, was one of those who pushed for the museum to be built, wrote

"Ce Mémorial a été édifié par les survivants de Verdun, en souvenir de leurs camarades tombés dans la bataille pour que ceux qui viennent se recueillir et méditer aux lieux mêmes de leur sacrifice, comprennent l'idéal et la foi qui les ont inspirés et soutenus."

== The wall of the Israelites at Fleury-devant-Douaumont ==
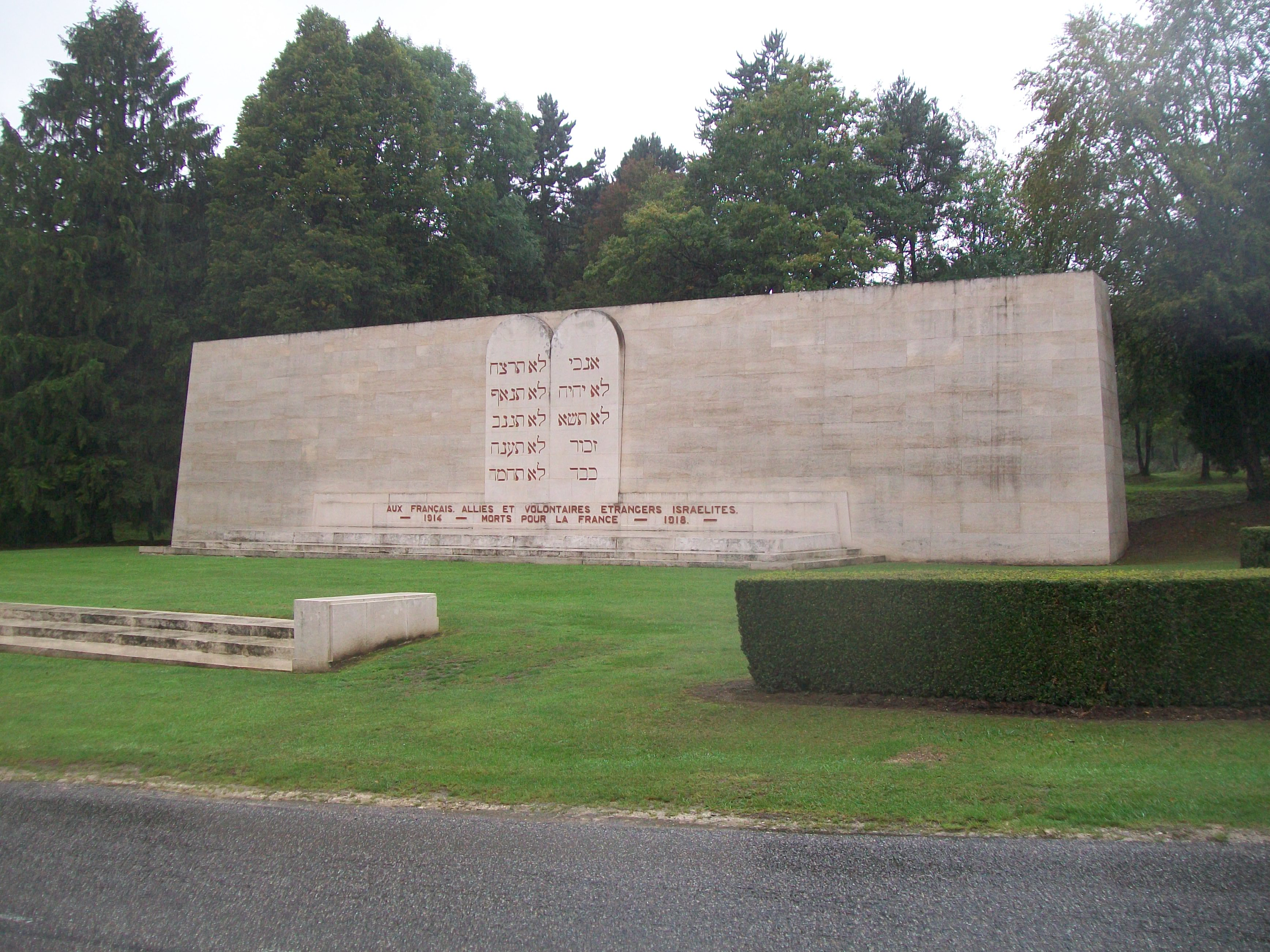
The wall of the Israelites at Fleury-devant-Douaumont

This monument stands between the Douaumont ossuary and the monument dedicated to the Jews who died at Verdun and is dedicated to the memory of those Jews who laid down their lives in the 1914-1918 war. The wall is 25 metres long and 15 metres high and is inscribed with the text of Hebrew Laws, reminding one of Jerusalem's "Wailing wall". The inscription reads

"DEDICATED TO THE JEWISH FRENCH. JEWISH ALLIES, AND FOREIGN VOLUNTEERS. -1914 – DIED FOR FRANCE – 1918"

The memorial says :

TO THE FRENCH, THE ALLIES AND THE FOREIGN VOLUNTARY ISRAELITES -1914- DIED FOR FRANCE -1918-

== The chapel of Saint-Nicolas at Fleury-devant-Douaumont ==
This chapel is called Notre-Dame-de-l'Europe and has stained glass windows by Jean-Jacques Gruber which depict two soldiers and a Pieta by Mr. Lucien Lantier and his wife.

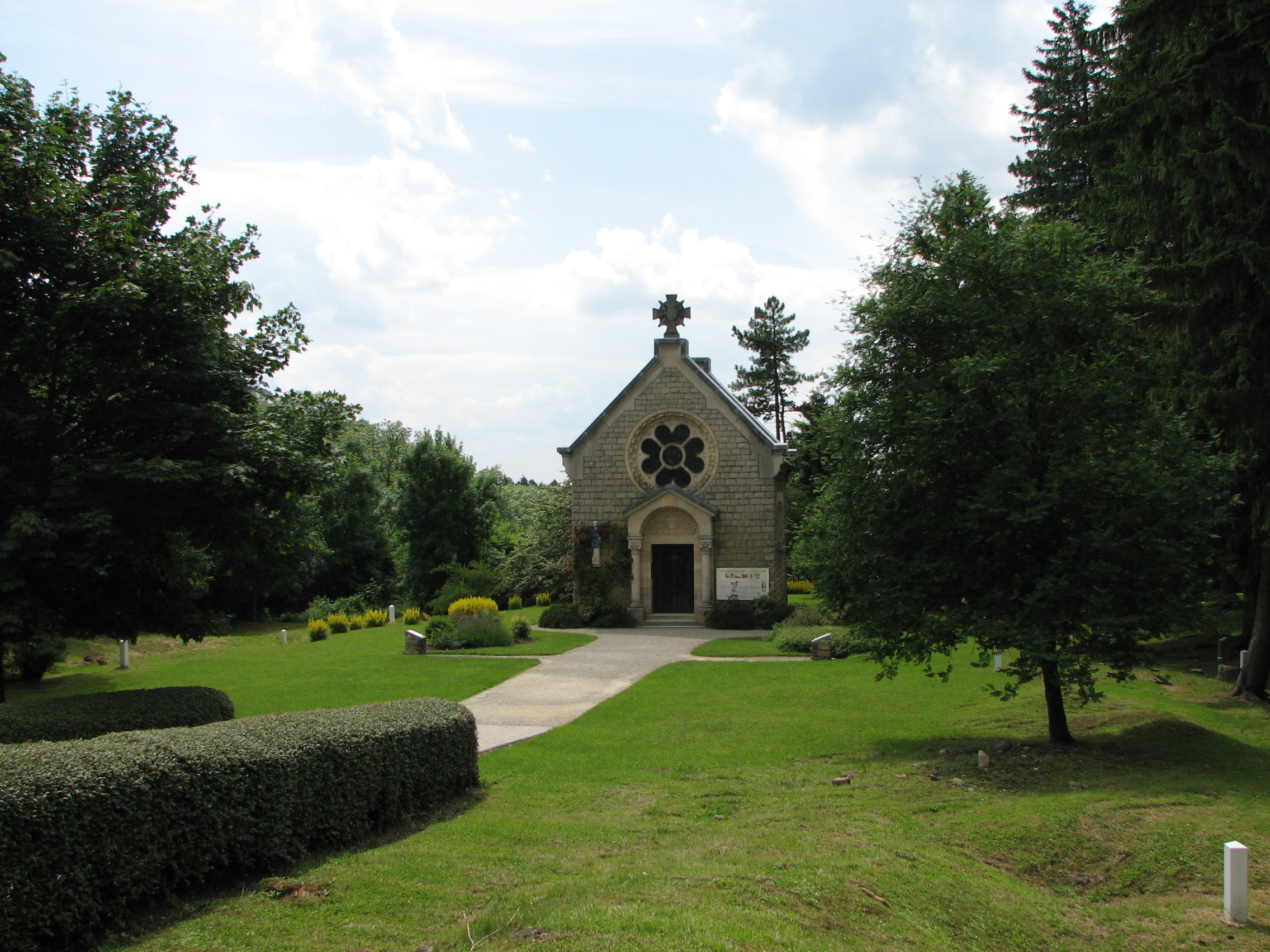
Church at Fleury-devant-Douaumont

== Memorial to the men who maintained the Voie Sacrée at Moulin-Brûlé ==
The memorial to the men who maintained the Voie Sacrée, or Sacred Path, is located by the road in question and on the plateau of Moulin-Brûlé.

It was inaugurated on 14 May 1967 by General Boucaud, the president of the "Fédération du Train (FNT)" and has sculptural work by François Barrois of Commercy. It was designed by the architect Gaston Schmitt of Toul. The monument stands on the point where soldiers would arrive in trucks and then would walk the 8 kilometres to the front line. Barrois' relief depicts the various kinds of trucks used on the Voie Sacrée, the railway with a depiction of the Corpet-Louvet locomotive, and the men working on maintenance. In the centre of the relief the words inscribed read

"Le train à ses anciens, à tous ceux de la Voie Sacrée"

It was along this road that French men and supplies were fed to the fighting area. At one point it was calculated that vehicles were passing every fourteen seconds, day and night, to ensure that Verdun could withstand the massive onslaught that it was subjected to in 1916. It was for good reason considered the "road to Hell". Thousands and thousands of men passed along the Voie Sacrée each day and 2,000 tons of munitions. To ensure the road was kept clear all men on foot were obliged to march through the surrounding fields and to maintain the road surface a unit of soldiers, equal to a full division of men, threw down some 700,000 tonnes of stones during the 10 months of the battle. A narrow gauge railway ran alongside the road. The Voie Sacree is now marked along its length with posts capped with a model of a French soldier's helmet. The posts tell the reader how far he is along the road from Bar-Le-Duc to Verdun.

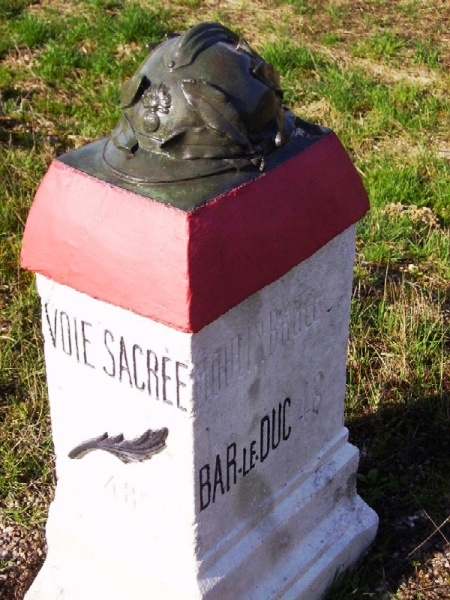
Road marker Verdun-Bar-le-Duc

== The Memorial to André Maginot ==
Just near to the Douaumont Ossuary and Cemetery and in the forested part of Souville is the memorial to André Maginot. The bronze sculpture on the memorial shows the wounded Maginot being helped from the battlefield of Verdun by a fellow soldier François-Joseph Jolas. This memorial was inaugurated in 1935 by the French President Albert Lebrun. The sculptor was Gaston Bocquet. Maginot was the Deputy for Bar-Le-Duc and a Government Minister before the war and when war broke out he enlisted as an ordinary soldier and fought at Verdun, sustaining a bad knee injury. After the war Maginot returned to politics and as Minister of Pensions lit the flame of remembrance at the opening of the tomb of the unknown warrior under the Arc de Triomphe. Throughout his life he worked tirelessly for Great War veterans and his name will forever be associated with the Maginot Line the ring of fortresses on the eastern border with Germany built in the 1930s to defend France against future German attack.

== Verdun Cathedral ==
Verdun Cathedral is one of the oldest cathedrals in Europe dating back to the year 990.

It was damaged by a bomb in 1916 and after the war much restoration was needed and the restorers André Ventre and Marcel Delangle were commissioned to supervise this restoration. Jean-Jacques Grüber was commissioned to work on the stained glass.

The crypt was quite unique and the restorers tried to change it as little as possible but one innovation was the commissioning in 1935 of the sculptor Gaston Le Bourgeois to carve the corbels of the crypt's pillars. This involved 13 corbels each having 4 sides, giving Le Bourgeois the task of completing 52 corbels. He chose two subjects for these carvings; episodes from the Battle of Verdun and the religious life of the town.

We can observe therefore alongside the religious figures, a soldier smoking his pipe, a pigeon from Fort Vaux, the lorries of the Voie Sacrée, artillery pieces, a padre, aviators, and other such symbols. One carving shows a soldier blindfolded and on his knees awaiting execution.

== Memorial to the men of the 130th Division at Douaumont ==
In the Douaumont area is the memorial to the men of the French 130th Division who fought as part of the Souville Garrison. Its position at the site of the former ruins of the Chapel of Sainte-Fine marks the furthest that the Germans managed to advance towards Verdun in their attack of 12 July 1916.

== Monument to the sons of Verdun ==
This monument is dedicated to the 518 men of Verdun who gave their lives in the 1914-1918 war. 510 were soldiers and 8 civilians. The architect was Forest and the sculptor and the monument took as its theme the words

"on ne passe pas"

as the five soldiers form a solid wall against which the Germans must pit themselves.

Inaugurated on 1 November 1928, the monument depicts a line of five soldiers representing the different arms of the armed forces. From left to right, there is a cavalryman with his sabre, in the centre is a young, determined infantryman, followed by an old colonial soldier with his distinct moustache and finally an artilleryman.

A sign next to the monument gives the following information

"ce monument oeuvre de Forest, Architecte, et de Grange, Sculpteur, Symbolise la célèbre devise de Verdun 1916 on ne passe pas cinq soldats de différentes armes au coude à coude, forment un mur contre lequel est venu se briser l'assaut de l'ennemi. Ce monument a été erigé à la mémoire des Enfants de Verdun morts pour la France"

Now the monument bears not only the names of the 518 casualties of World War I, but both military and civilian victims of the Second World War, including deportees and resistance fighters and those who lost their lives in Algeria and overseas.

The sculptor was Claude Grange (1883–1971) whose work we have encountered on the Chemin des Dames and the Basque memorial there.

== Monument to the victory at Verdun ==
This monument in Verdun was created by the French architect Léon Chesnay. The sculptor was Jean Boucher (1870–1939), who was himself a veteran of Verdun battle. The foundation stone of the monument was laid down in 1920 by War Minister André Lefèvre and the inauguration took place several years later on 23 June 1929, the ceremony being witnessed by Gaston Doumergue, the French President, Raymon Poincaré, the Prime Minister, several ministers and Pétain. Boucher's statue at the top of the monument depicts Charlemagne leaning on a large broadsword.

This monument is located at the summit of a stairway which links lower Verdun (rue Mazel) and upper Verdun (place de la Libération) and its pyramidal tower (30 m high) holds a crypt which was used to hold books with the names of those French and American soldiers who fought in this region (the books are now kept in the city hall). The crypt had been intended to hold the mortal remains of the 7 unknown soldiers who were not chosen during the 1920 ceremony to select the remains for the tomb of the unknown soldier in Paris but these remains are now in the Faubourg-Pavé military cemetery.

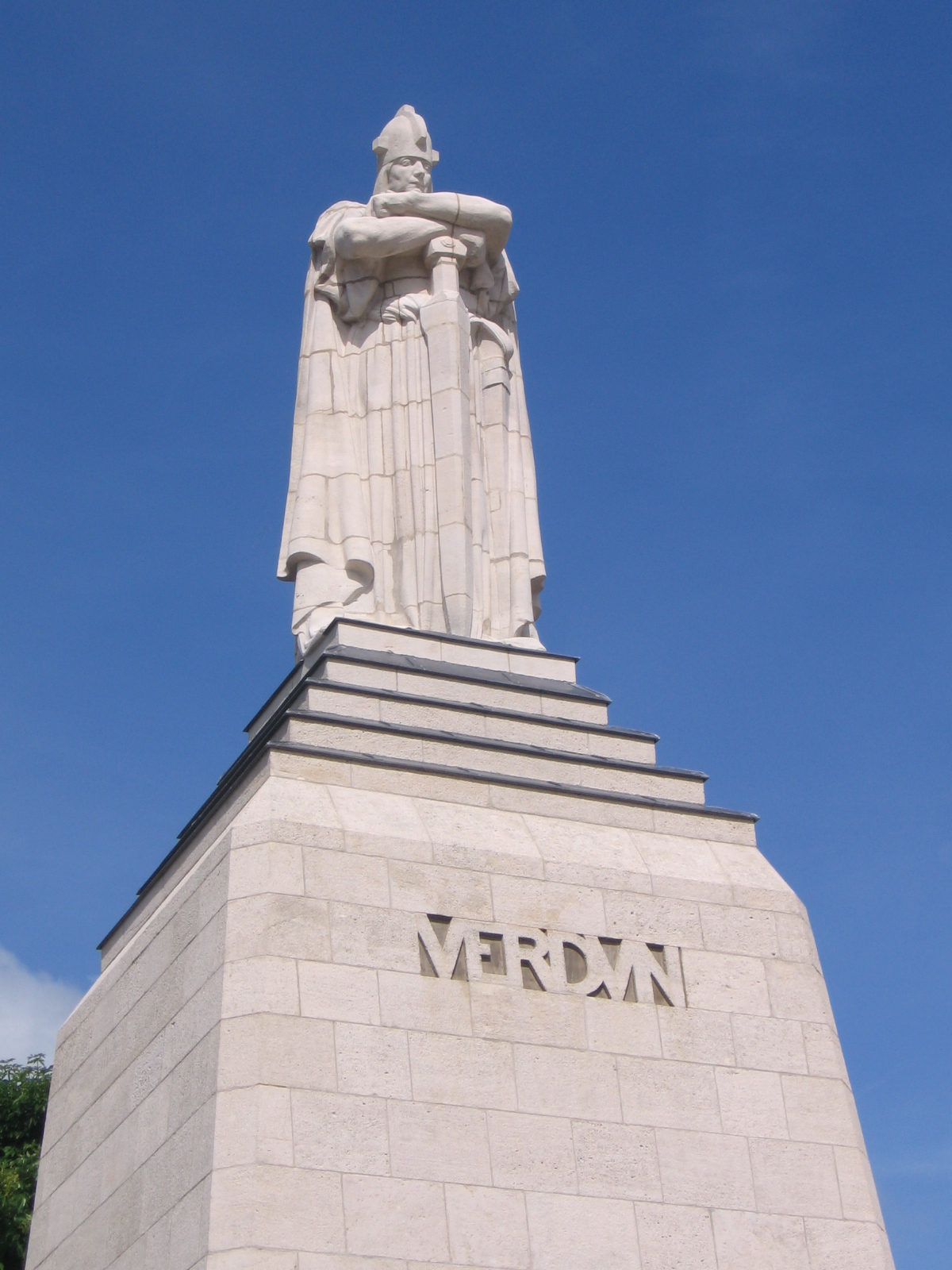
Charlemagne at the summit of Verdun's Victory Monument

== Le père Barnabé at Samogneux ==
Samogneux was a village some 15 kilometres (9.3 mi) to the north of Verdun which was totally destroyed in the war and the character was the creation of the writer Henry Frémont. "Le Père Barnabé" came to symbolise the people of the Meuse in 1914–1918.

It was the American Miss Horace Gray de Boston, who asked Henri Frémont for permission to translate and sell the book in the US, and funds raised were used to rebuild the village. There is a monument entitled "Le père Barnabé" which was erected in 1930 in front of the ancient village church. This shows a Meuse peasant standing before the ruins of his village and this monument was funded by both Henri Frémont and Miss Gray.

== Gallery of Images ==
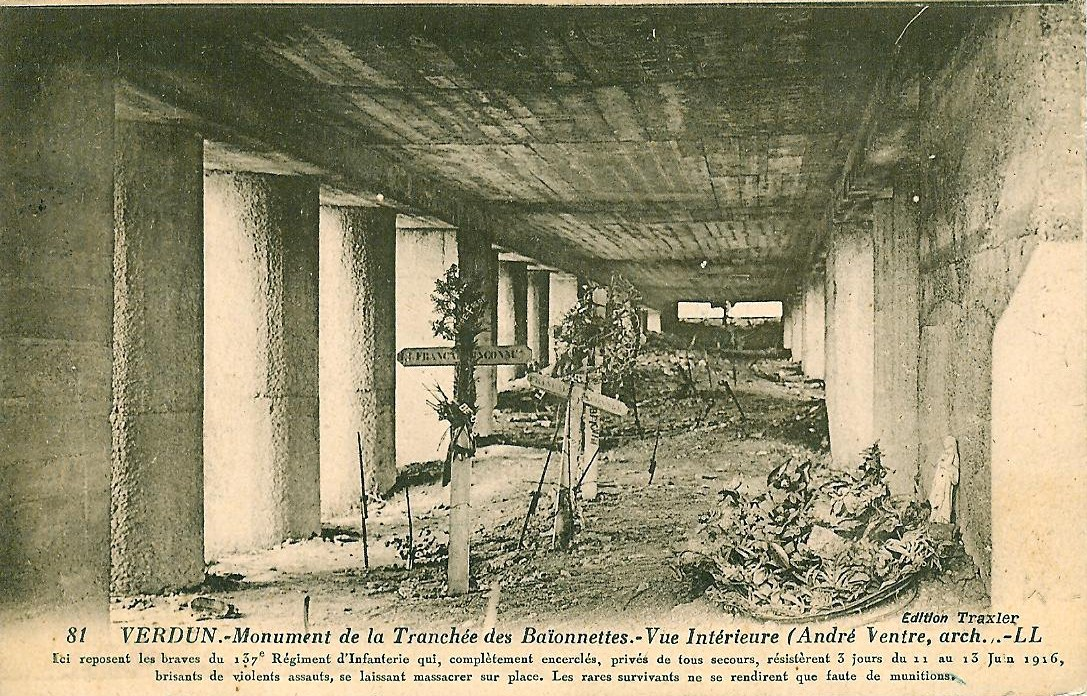
The "Trench of Bayonets"

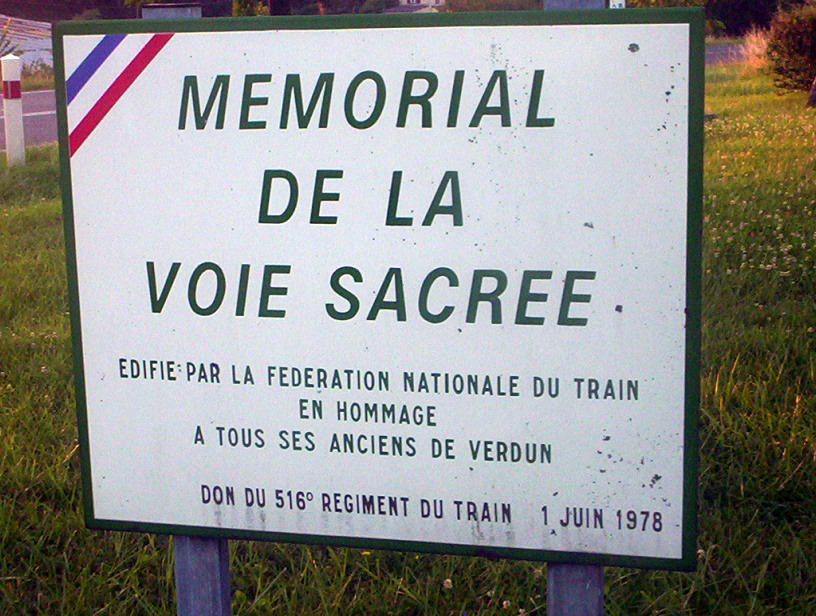
Sign announcing the "Voie Sacrée"

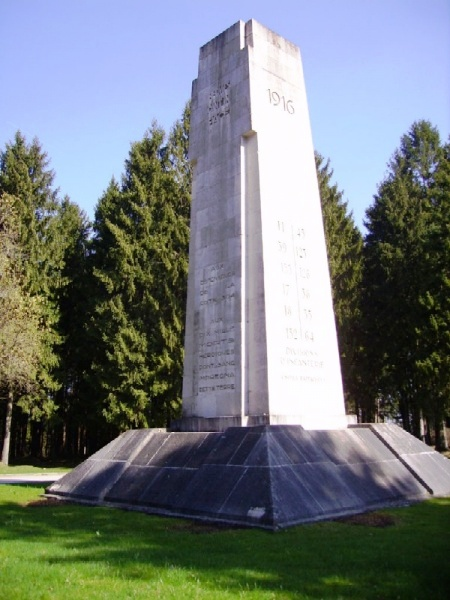
Monument on Hill 304

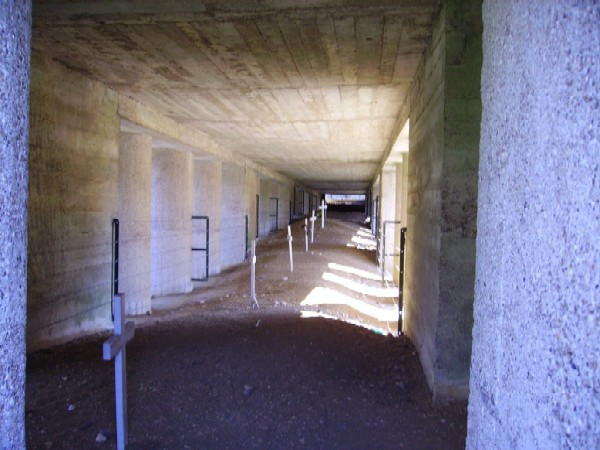
The "Trench of Bayonets" at Verdun.

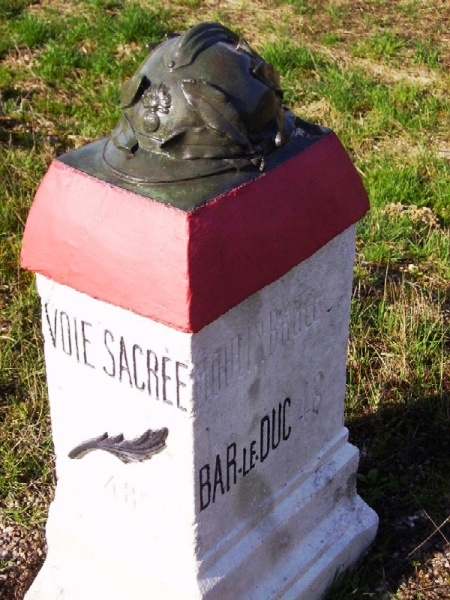
One of the markers along the road from Bar-le-Duc to Verdun.

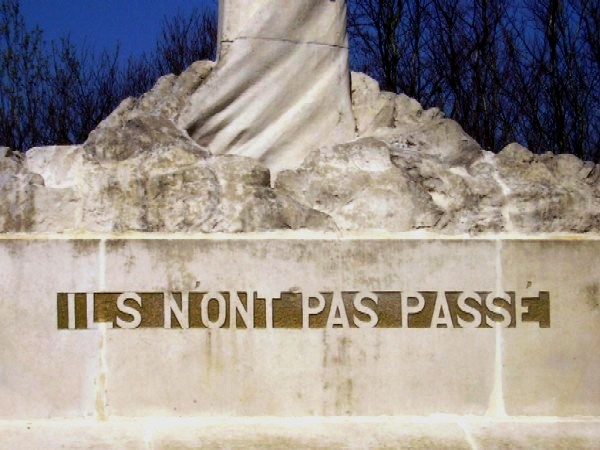
Mort Homme

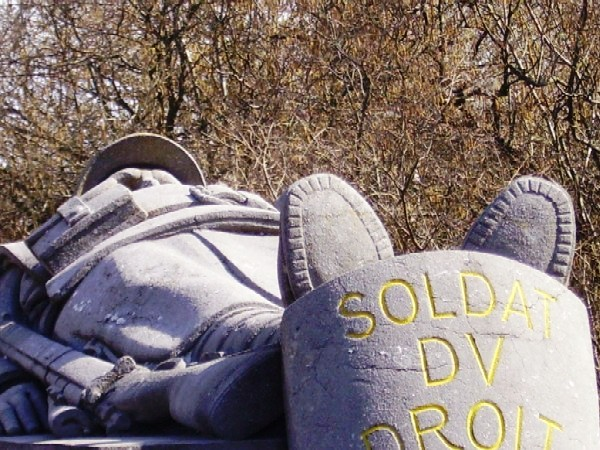
The "Soldat du Droit"

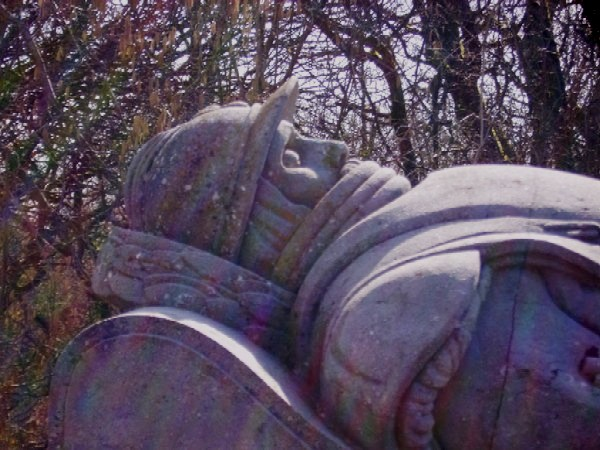
The "Soldat du Droit"

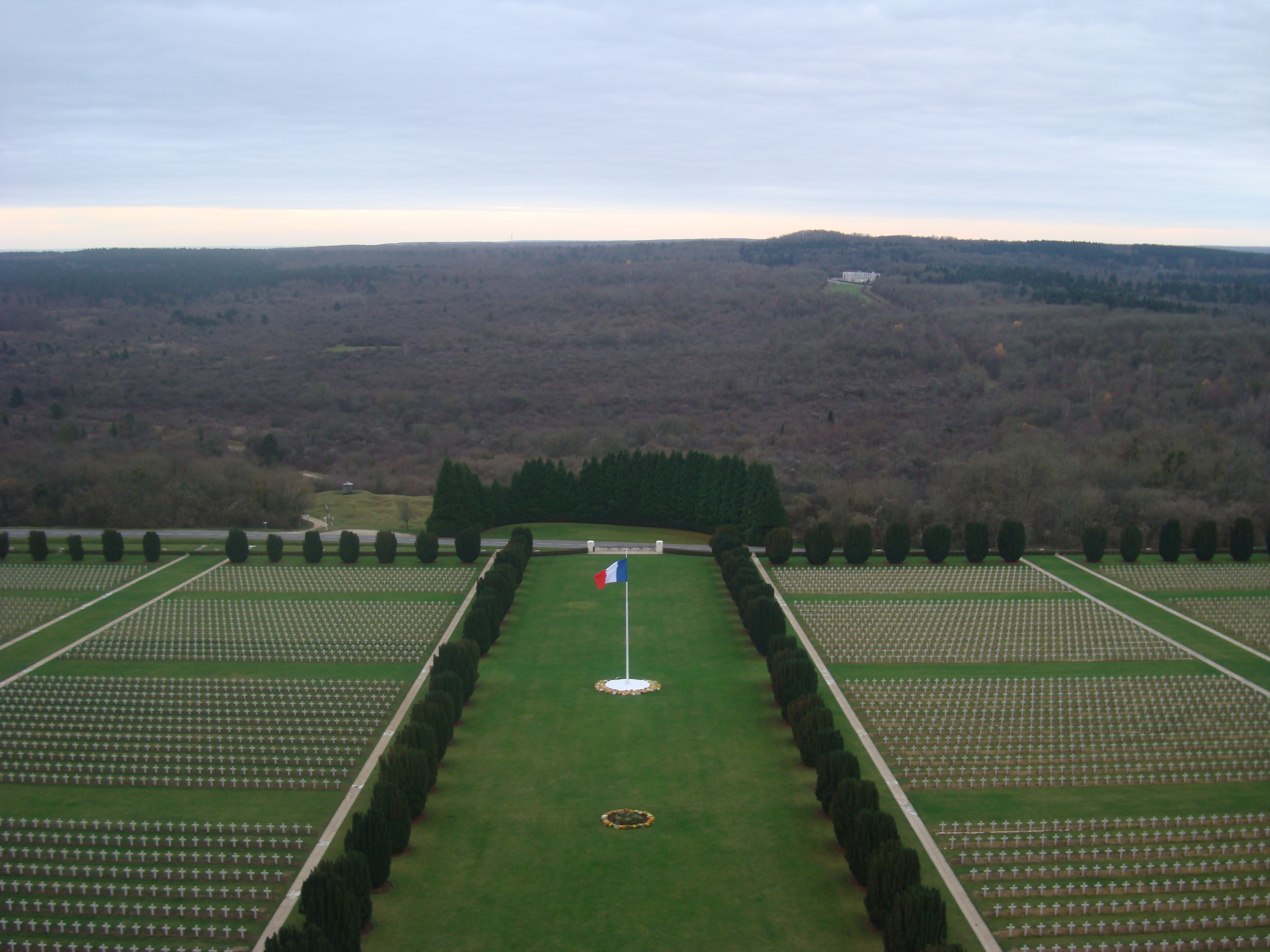
The cemetery at Douau

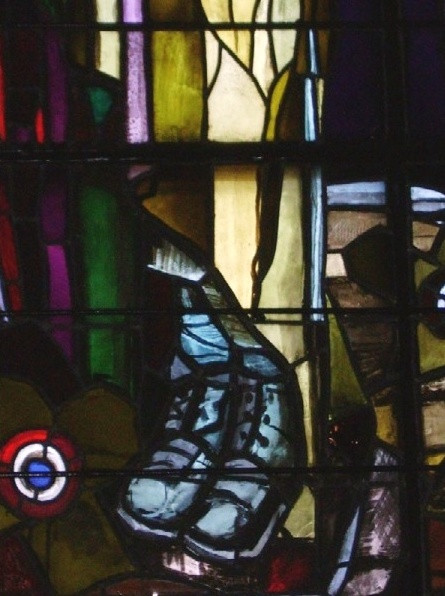
Stained glass at Douaumont

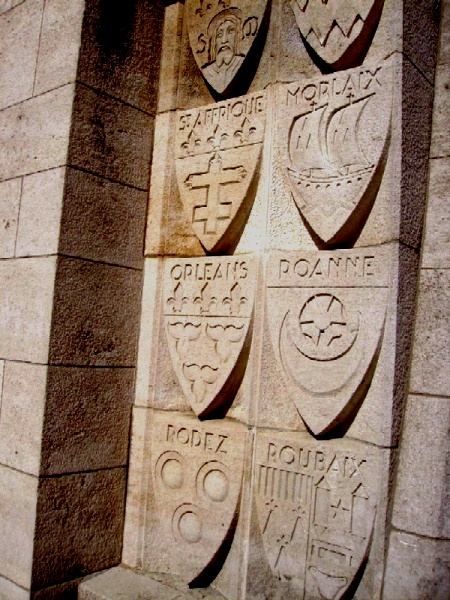
Shields on the outside of the ossuary of towns and cities who contributed to its cost.

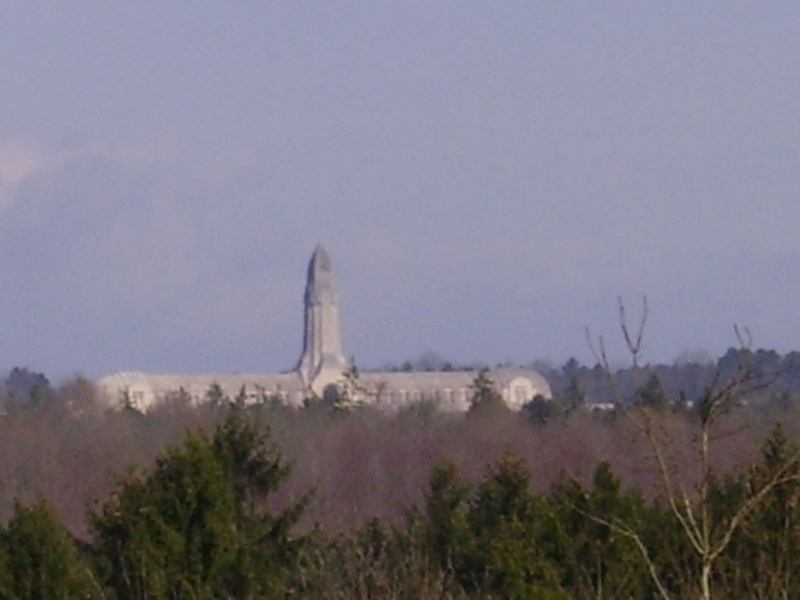
The Douaumont ossuary seen from a distance

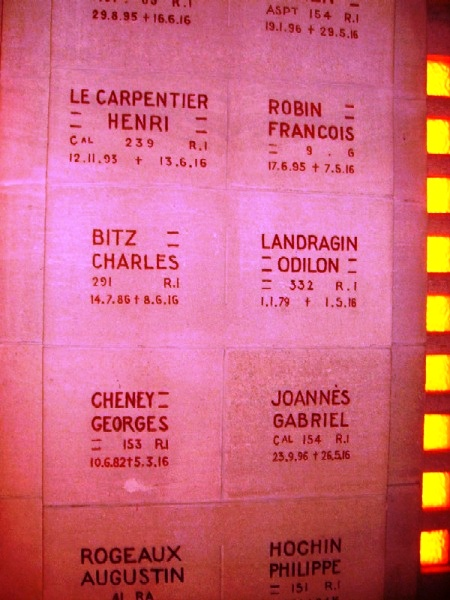
Names on the walls of the ossuary's interior

== See also ==
- List of World War I Memorials and Cemeteries in Lorraine
- World War I Memorials and Cemeteries in Alsace
- List of World War I memorials and cemeteries in the area of the St Mihiel salient
- List of World War I memorials and cemeteries in Champagne-Ardennes
- List of World War I memorials and cemeteries in the Somme
- List of World War I memorials and cemeteries in Artois
- List of World War I memorials and cemeteries in Flanders
