= Haumont-près-Samogneux =

- Commune
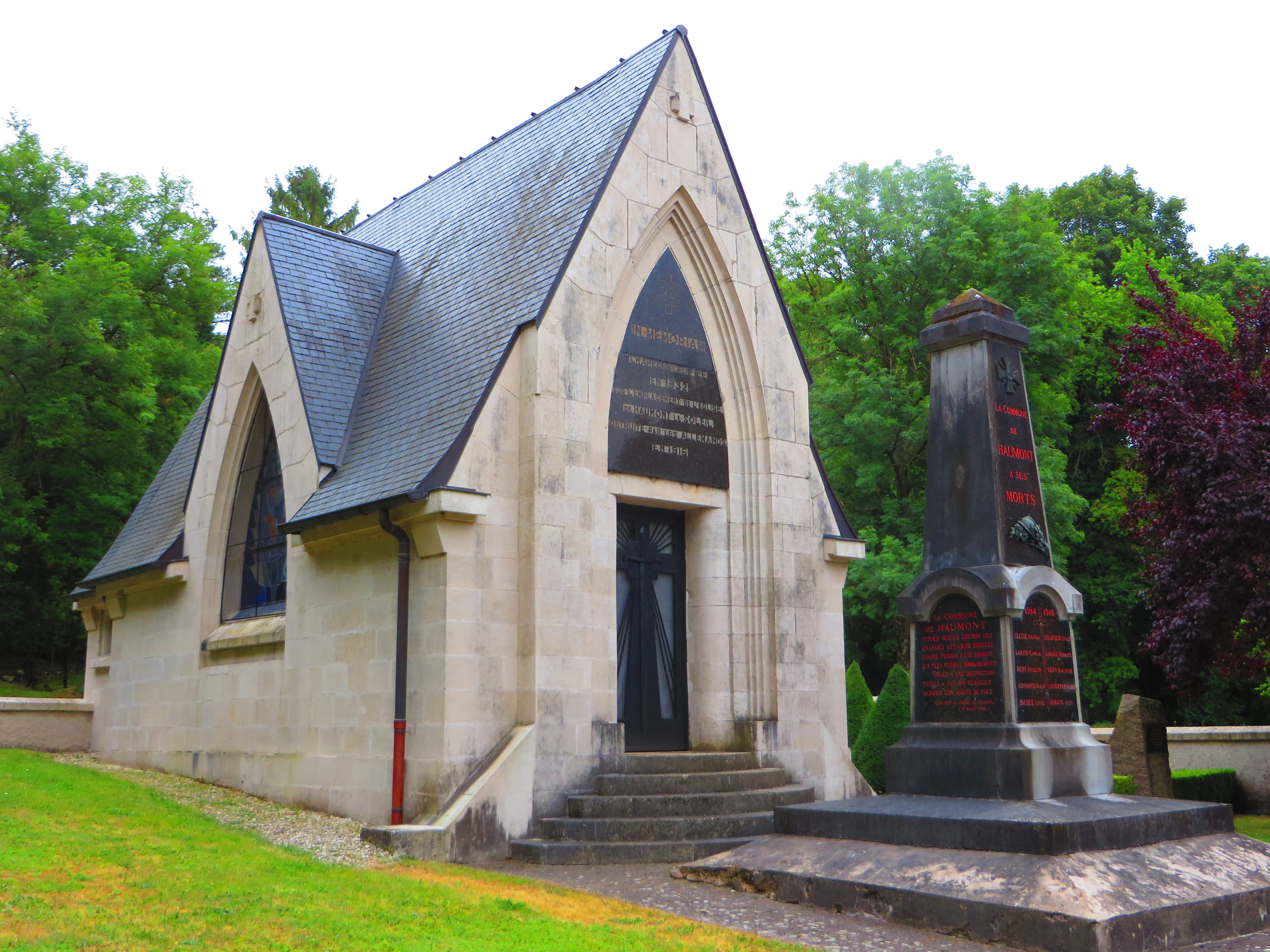
- The chapel in Haumont-près-Samogneux

- Coat of arms
- Location of Haumont-près-Samogneux
- Location within France Location within Grand Est
- Coordinates: 49°16′25″N 5°21′12″E
- Country: France
- Region: Grand Est
- Department: Meuse
- Arrondissement: Verdun
- Canton: Belleville-sur-Meuse
- Intercommunality: CA Grand Verdun

Government
  - Mayor (2020–2026): Gérard Gervaise
- Area^{1}: 10.81 km^{2} (4.17 sq mi)
- Elevation: 250 m (820 ft)
- Highest elevation: 355 m (1,165 ft)
- Lowest elevation: 194 m (636 ft)
- Population (2023): 0
  - Density: 0.0/km^{2} (0.0/sq mi)
- Time zone: UTC+01:00 (CET)
  - Summer (DST): UTC+02:00 (CEST)
- INSEE/Postal code: 55239 /55100
- ^{1} French Land Register data, which excludes lakes, ponds, glaciers > 1 km^{2} (0.386 sq mi or 247 acres) and river estuaries.

Haumont-près-Samogneux (French pronunciation: [omɔ̃ pʁɛ samɔɲø], literally Haumont near Samogneux) is a commune in the Meuse department in Grand Est in north-eastern France.

The capture of the town by the German Fifth Army began the Battle of Verdun during World War I in 1916. Since then, it has been unoccupied (official population: 0) along with Bezonvaux, Beaumont-en-Verdunois, Louvemont-Côte-du-Poivre, Cumières-le-Mort-Homme and Fleury-devant-Douaumont.

During the war, the town was completely destroyed and the land was made uninhabitable to such an extent that a decision was made not to rebuild it. The site of the commune is maintained as a testimony to war and is officially designated as a "village that died for France" (in French: village mort pour la France). It is managed by a municipal council of three members appointed by the prefect of the Meuse department.

== See also ==
- Zone rouge (First World War)
- List of French villages destroyed in World War I
- Communes of the Meuse department
