= Cumières-le-Mort-Homme =

- Commune
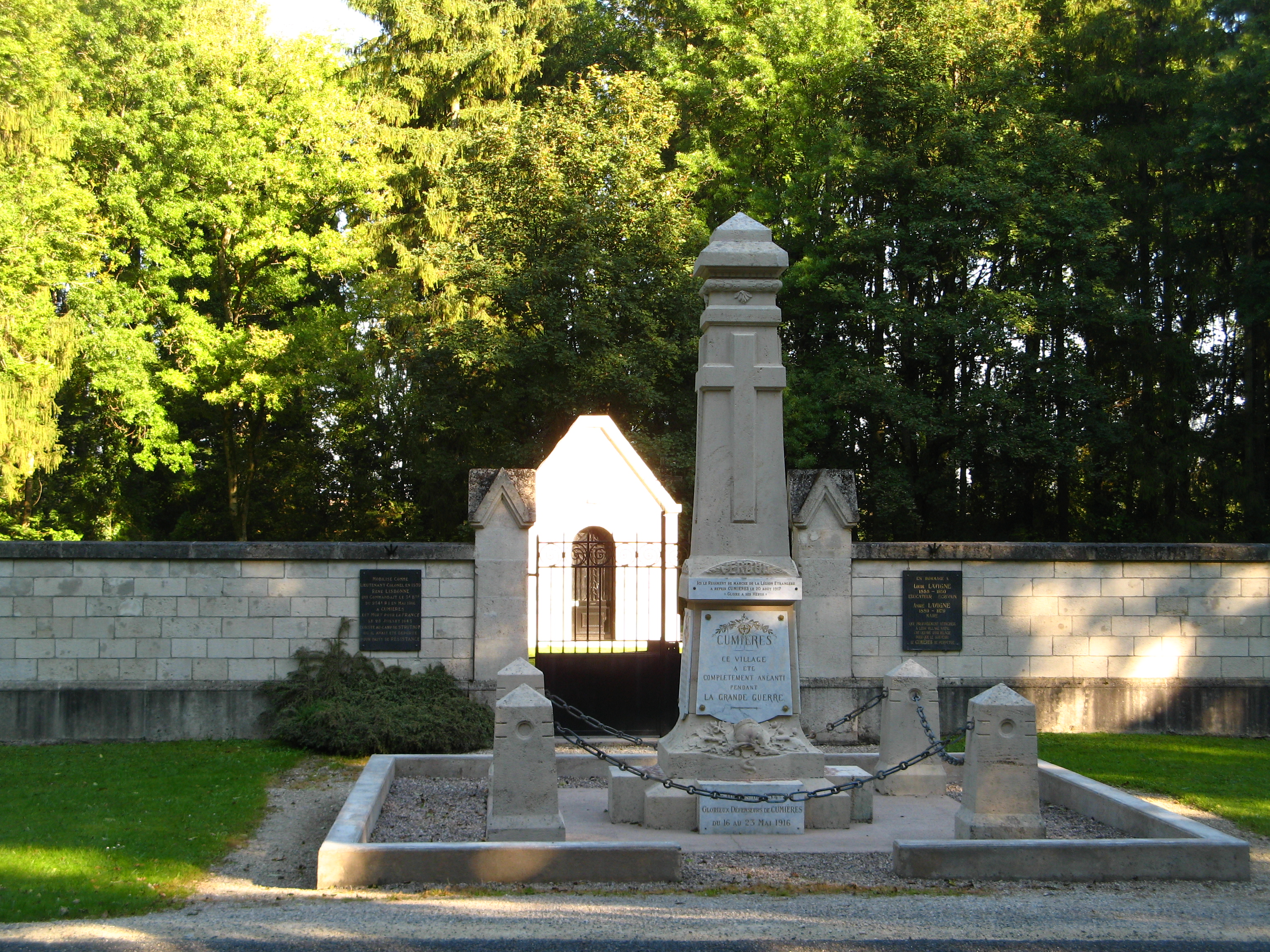
- The war memorial in Cumières-le-Mort-Homme

- Coat of arms
- Location of Cumières-le-Mort-Homme
- Location within France Location within Grand Est
- Coordinates: 49°14′00″N 5°16′54″E
- Country: France
- Region: Grand Est
- Department: Meuse
- Arrondissement: Verdun
- Canton: Belleville-sur-Meuse
- Intercommunality: CA Grand Verdun
- Area^{1}: 6.11 km^{2} (2.36 sq mi)
- Elevation: 188 m (617 ft)
- Highest elevation: 287 m (942 ft)
- Lowest elevation: 185 m (607 ft)
- Population (2023): 0
  - Density: 0.0/km^{2} (0.0/sq mi)
- Time zone: UTC+01:00 (CET)
  - Summer (DST): UTC+02:00 (CEST)
- INSEE/Postal code: 55139 /55100
- ^{1} French Land Register data, which excludes lakes, ponds, glaciers > 1 km^{2} (0.386 sq mi or 247 acres) and river estuaries.

Cumières-le-Mort-Homme (French pronunciation: [kymjɛʁ lə mɔʁ ɔm]) is a ghost commune in the Meuse department in Grand Est in north-eastern France. In English, the name of the commune translates to "Cumières of the dead people".

Since the end of the Battle of Verdun in 1916, it has been unoccupied (official population: 0), as have Bezonvaux, Beaumont-en-Verdunois, Haumont-près-Samogneux, Louvemont-Côte-du-Poivre, and Fleury-devant-Douaumont.

== History ==
During World War I, the town was destroyed and the land made so uninhabitable that officials decided not to rebuild it. The site is maintained as a testimony to war and is officially designated a "village that died for France" (in French: village mort pour la France). It is managed by a municipal council of three members appointed by the prefect of the Meuse department.

== See also ==
- Zone rouge (First World War)
- List of French villages destroyed in World War I
- Communes of the Meuse department
