= List of French villages destroyed in World War I =

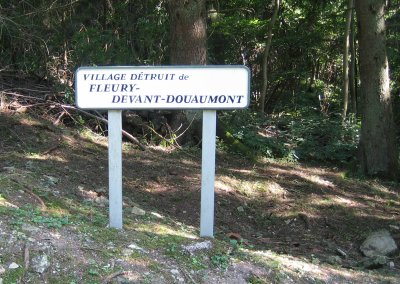
Sign indicating the site of the destroyed village of Fleury-devant-Douaumont

Les villages détruits (the destroyed villages) are in northern France, mostly in the French département of Meuse. During the First World War, specifically at the time of the Battle of Verdun in 1916, many villages in northern France were destroyed by the fighting. After the war, it was decided that the land previously occupied by the destroyed villages would not be incorporated into other communes, as a testament to these villages which had "died for France", as they were declared, and to preserve their memory.

Another factor in village abandonment was the sheer destruction of the war, creating the zone rouge. The vast amounts of human and animal remains, and millions of items of unexploded ordnance contaminating the land, complicated attempts to rebuild, and entirely prevented some villages from being rebuilt.

== List of villages (communes) ==
=== In Meuse ===
While three of the villages in Meuse were subsequently rebuilt and are governed as normal communes, the other six are entirely unpopulated and are managed by a council of three members, appointed by the prefect of Meuse. All of these communes are located in the canton of Belleville-sur-Meuse (in the canton of Charny-sur-Meuse before cantonal reorganization in 2015) in the arrondissement of Verdun, and are generally located north of the city of Verdun, in the Lorraine region of northeastern France.

- Beaumont-en-Verdunois
- Bezonvaux
- Cumières-le-Mort-Homme
- Douaumont (partially reconstructed)
- Fleury-devant-Douaumont, location of the Verdun Memorial
- Haumont-près-Samogneux
- Louvemont-Côte-du-Poivre
- Ornes (partially reconstructed)
- Vaux-devant-Damloup (rebuilt)

=== In Marne ===
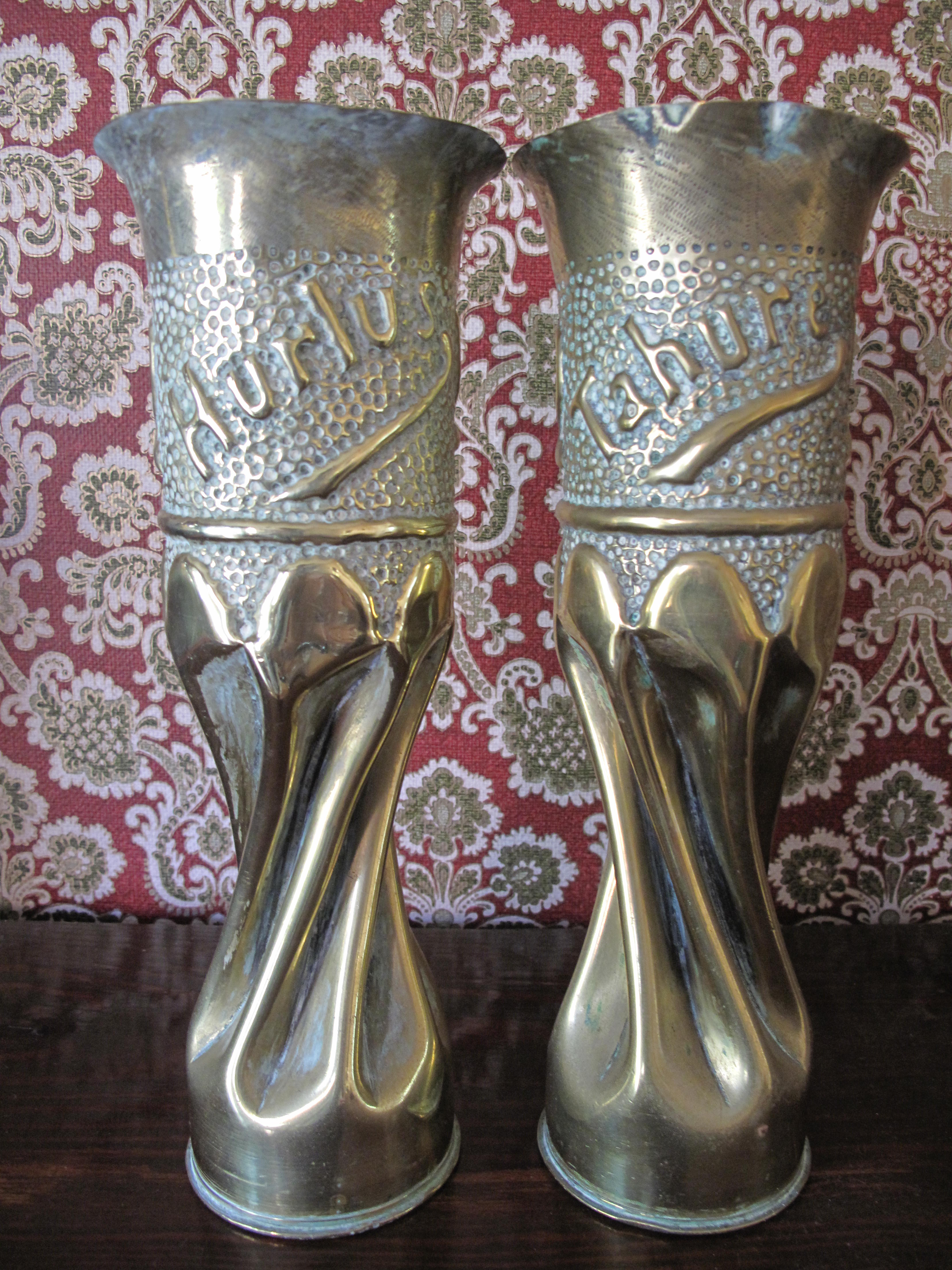
Pair of shell cases enscribed with the names Hurlus and Tahure.

- Auve
- Beauséjour, Marne
- Bignicourt-sur-Saultz (3/33 homes remained) 30 men and 45 women and children were taken captive.
- Étrepy (7/70 homes remained)
- Glannes
- Hurlus
- Le Mesnil-lès-Hurlus
- Perthes-lès-Hurlus
- Ripont
- Somme-Tourbe (everything in the village except the village hall (Mairie), church, and two private buildings)
- Tahure
- Moronvilliers
- Nauroy
- Sermaize-les-Bains (40/900 homes remained). About 150 people from the village were taken captive.
- Suippes

=== In Meurthe-et-Moselle ===
- Regniéville
- Remenauville
- Fey-en-Haye
- Flirey

=== In Aisne ===
- Moussy-sur-Aisne
- Vauclerc-et-la-Vallée-Foulon
- Ailles
- Beaulne-et-Chivy
- Courtecon
- Craonne

== See also ==
- Mort pour la France
- No man's land, the area between the lines during the First World War
- Oradour-sur-Glane, a village in Limousin destroyed in the Second World War and later rebuilt nearby.
- Pozières (located in the département of Somme)
- Zone rouge
