= Louvemont-Côte-du-Poivre =

- Commune
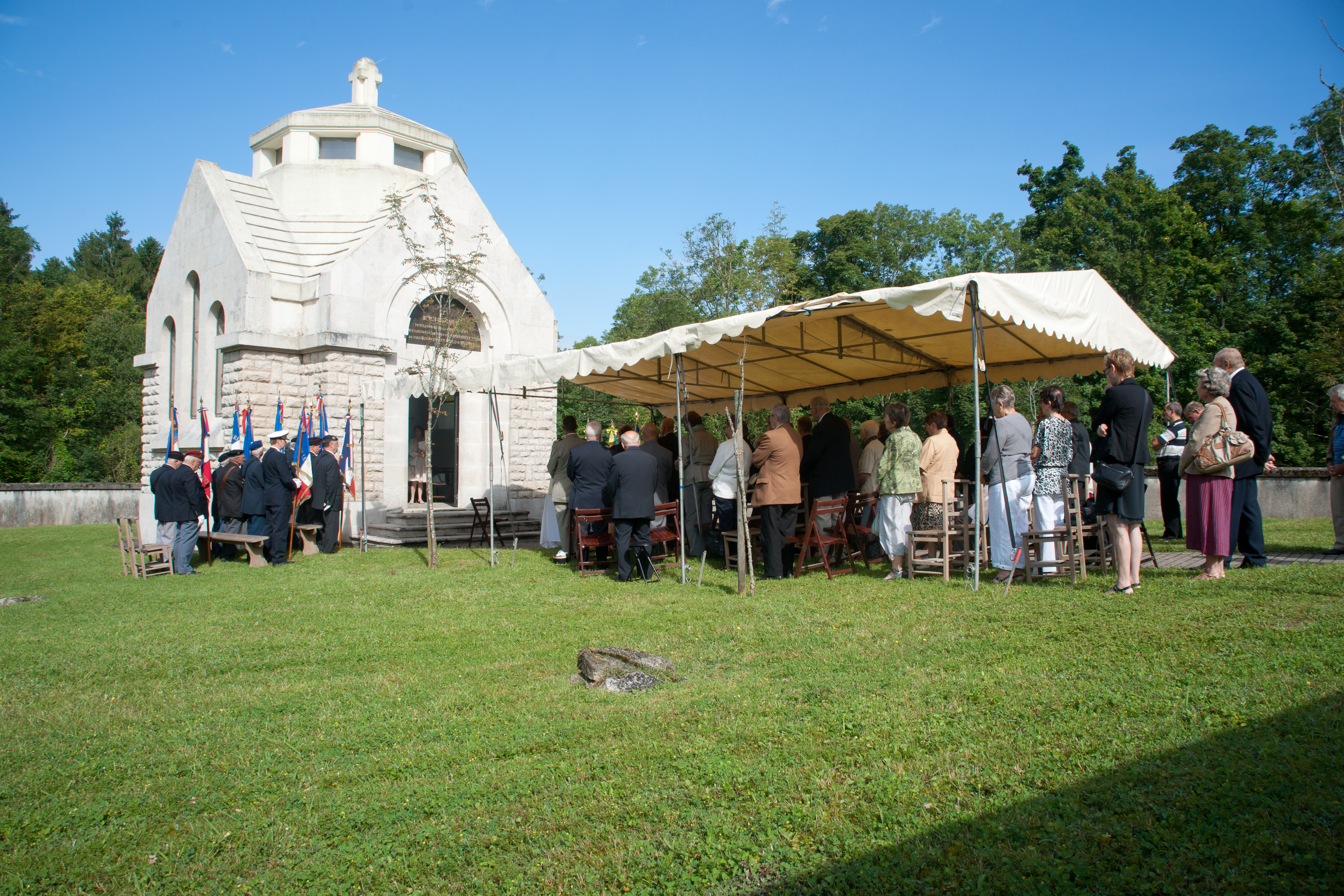
- The chapel in Louvemont-Côte-du-Poivre

- Coat of arms
- Location of Louvemont-Côte-du-Poivre
- Location within France Location within Grand Est
- Coordinates: 49°14′18″N 5°23′56″E
- Country: France
- Region: Grand Est
- Department: Meuse
- Arrondissement: Verdun
- Canton: Belleville-sur-Meuse
- Intercommunality: CA Grand Verdun

Government
  - Mayor (2020–2026): François-Xavier Long
- Area^{1}: 8.25 km^{2} (3.19 sq mi)
- Elevation: 321 m (1,053 ft)
- Highest elevation: 375 m (1,230 ft)
- Lowest elevation: 214 m (702 ft)
- Population (2023): 0
  - Density: 0.0/km^{2} (0.0/sq mi)
- Time zone: UTC+01:00 (CET)
  - Summer (DST): UTC+02:00 (CEST)
- INSEE/Postal code: 55307 /55100
- ^{1} French Land Register data, which excludes lakes, ponds, glaciers > 1 km^{2} (0.386 sq mi or 247 acres) and river estuaries.

Louvemont-Côte-du-Poivre (French pronunciation: [luvmɔ̃ kot dy pwavʁ]) is a commune in the Meuse department in Grand Est in north-eastern France.

Since the end of the Battle of Verdun in 1916, it has been unoccupied (official population: 0) along with Bezonvaux, Beaumont-en-Verdunois, Haumont-près-Samogneux, Cumières-le-Mort-Homme and Fleury-devant-Douaumont.

During the war, the town was destroyed and the land was made uninhabitable to such an extent that a decision was made not to rebuild it. The site of the commune is maintained as a testimony to war and is officially designated as a "village that died for France" (in French: village mort pour la France). It is managed by a municipal council of three members appointed by the prefect of the Meuse department.

== See also ==
- Zone rouge (First World War)
- List of French villages destroyed in World War I
- Communes of the Meuse department
