= Beaumont-en-Verdunois =

- Commune
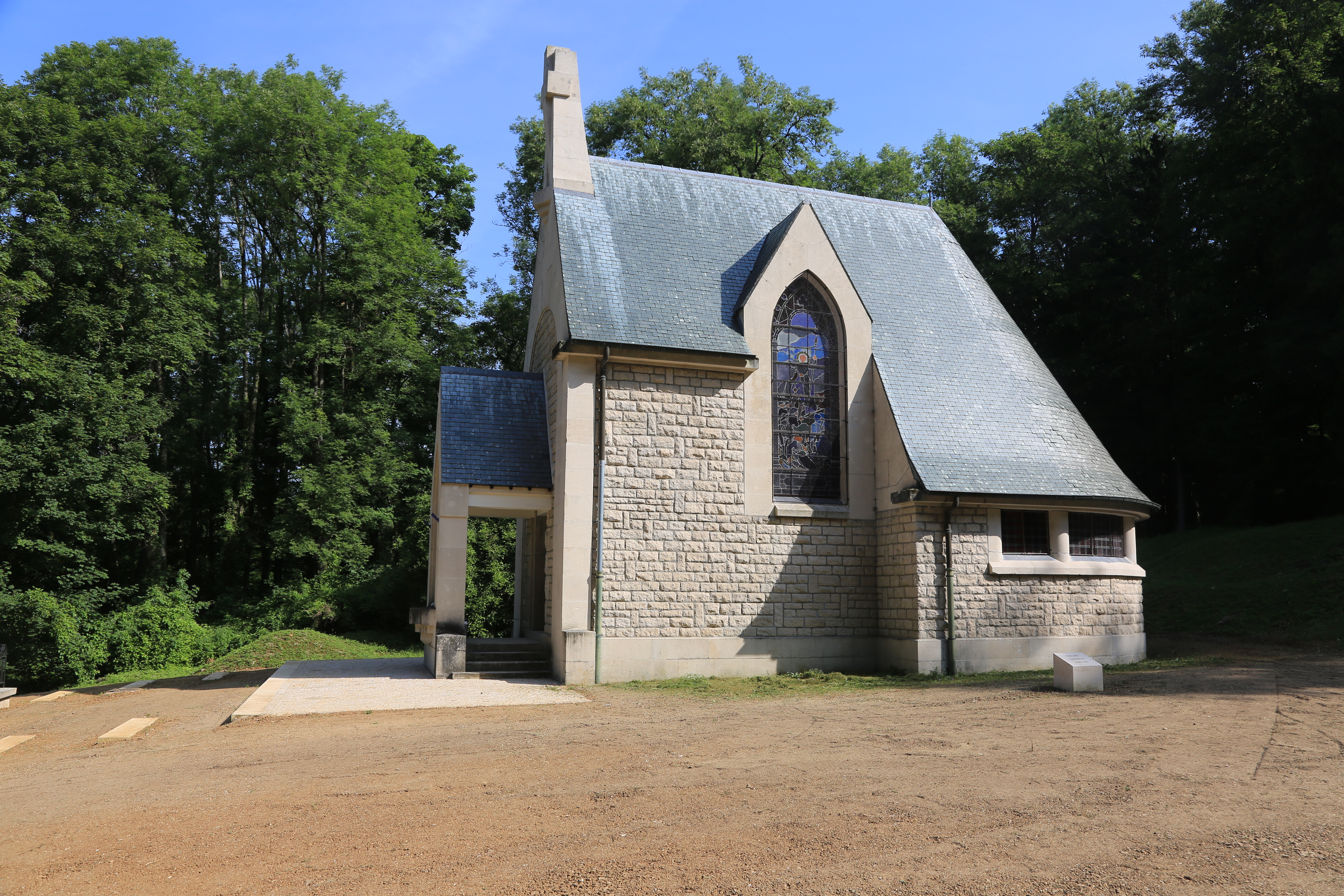
- The chapel in Beaumont-en-Verdunois

- Coat of arms
- Location of Beaumont-en-Verdunois
- Location within France Location within Grand Est
- Coordinates: 49°15′33″N 5°24′30″E
- Country: France
- Region: Grand Est
- Department: Meuse
- Arrondissement: Verdun
- Canton: Belleville-sur-Meuse
- Intercommunality: CA Grand Verdun

Government
  - Mayor (2020–2026): Pierre Libert
- Area^{1}: 7.87 km^{2} (3.04 sq mi)
- Elevation: 305 m (1,001 ft)
- Highest elevation: 372 m (1,220 ft)
- Lowest elevation: 233 m (764 ft)
- Population (2023): 0
  - Density: 0.0/km^{2} (0.0/sq mi)
- Time zone: UTC+01:00 (CET)
  - Summer (DST): UTC+02:00 (CEST)
- INSEE/Postal code: 55039 /55100
- ^{1} French Land Register data, which excludes lakes, ponds, glaciers > 1 km^{2} (0.386 sq mi or 247 acres) and river estuaries.

Beaumont-en-Verdunois (French pronunciation: [bomɔ̃ ɑ̃ vɛʁdynwa]) is a commune in the Meuse department of the Grand Est region of northeastern France.

Since the Battle of Verdun in 1916, the village has had no permanent residents (official population: 0), as is the case with other destroyed villages in the region: Bezonvaux, Haumont-près-Samogneux, Louvemont-Côte-du-Poivre, Cumières-le-Mort-Homme and Fleury-devant-Douaumont.

From 1925 onwards, the mayorship of the town has been within one family, today held by Pierre Libert.

== History ==
=== World War One ===
On 21 February 1916, the Battle of Verdun commenced and the area surrounding Verdun, including the village of Beaumont-en-Verdunois began suffering heavy shelling. Beaumont-en-Verdunois was lost by French troops on 23 February 1916, and regained on the 8 October 1918, though the village was almost completely destroyed at this point as a result of relentless shelling from both German and French sides.

As a result of the war, the land was made uninhabitable to such an extent that a decision was made not to rebuild it. The site of the destroyed village is within the Zone rouge, an area of completely devastated land unsuitable for agriculture or human life. Today, the village has no permanent residents, and the site of the commune is maintained as a monument to the French war effort, officially designated as a "village mort pour la France". ("village that died for France") It is managed by a municipal council of three members appointed by the prefect of the Meuse department.

== See also ==
- List of French villages destroyed in World War I
- Communes of the Meuse department
- Ghost town
