= Bezonvaux =

- Commune
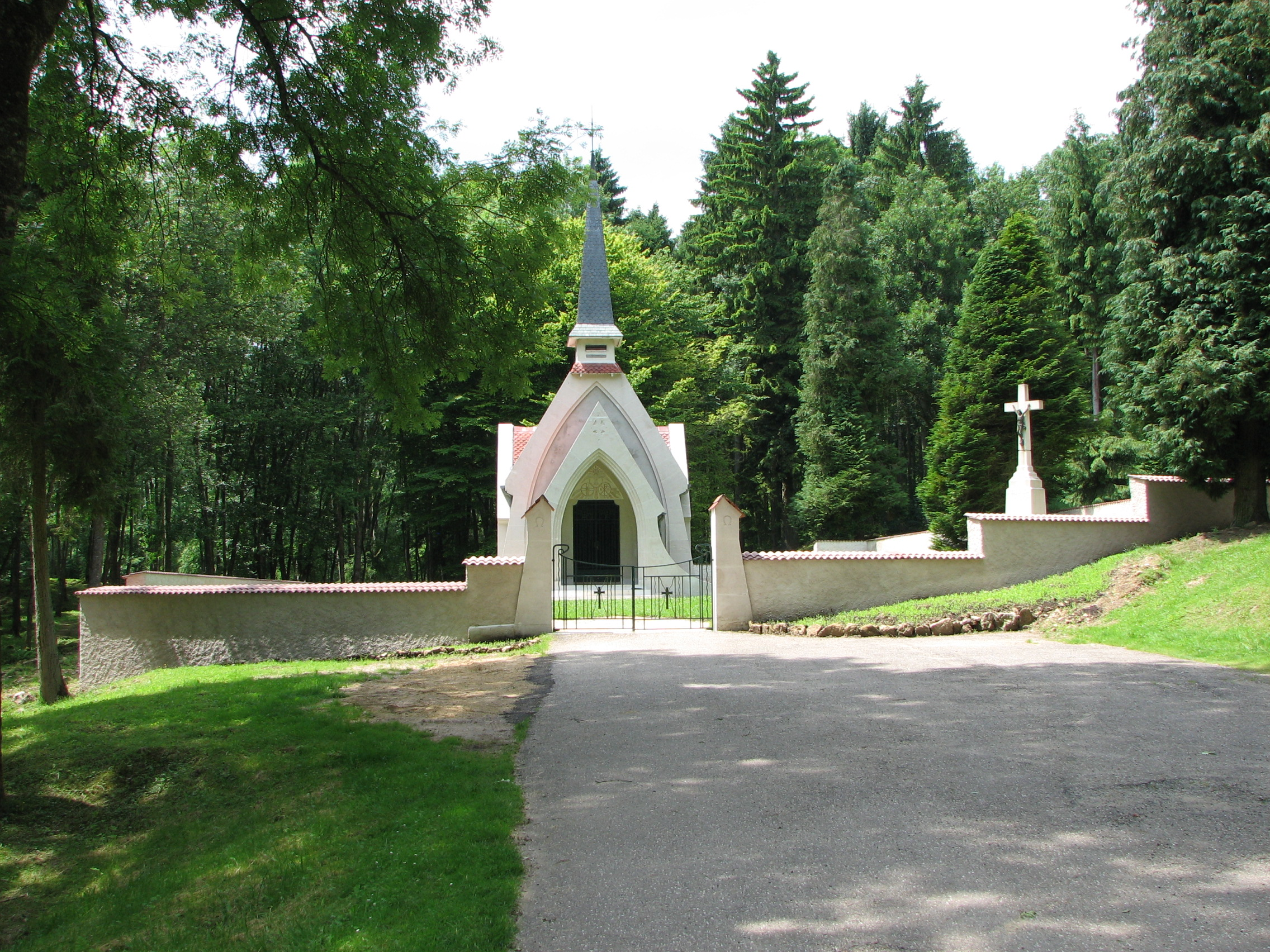
- The church in Bezonvaux

- Coat of arms
- Location of Bezonvaux
- Location within France Location within Grand Est
- Coordinates: 49°14′15″N 5°28′06″E
- Country: France
- Region: Grand Est
- Department: Meuse
- Arrondissement: Verdun
- Canton: Belleville-sur-Meuse
- Intercommunality: CA Grand Verdun
- Area^{1}: 9.23 km^{2} (3.56 sq mi)
- Elevation: 257 m (843 ft)
- Highest elevation: 367 m (1,204 ft)
- Lowest elevation: 226 m (741 ft)
- Population (2023): 0
  - Density: 0.0/km^{2} (0.0/sq mi)
- Time zone: UTC+01:00 (CET)
  - Summer (DST): UTC+02:00 (CEST)
- INSEE/Postal code: 55050 /55400
- ^{1} French Land Register data, which excludes lakes, ponds, glaciers > 1 km^{2} (0.386 sq mi or 247 acres) and river estuaries.

Bezonvaux (French pronunciation: [bəzɔ̃vo]) is a commune in the Meuse department in the Grand Est region in northeastern France.

== History ==
Since the end of the Battle of Verdun in 1916, it has been unoccupied (official population: 0) along with Beaumont-en-Verdunois, Haumont-près-Samogneux, Louvemont-Côte-du-Poivre, Cumières-le-Mort-Homme and Fleury-devant-Douaumont.

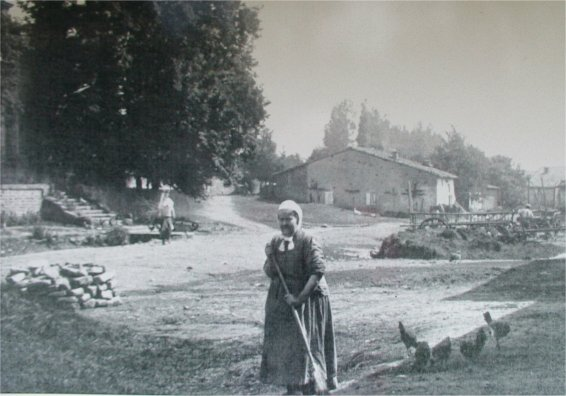
Historical photo of Bezonvaux

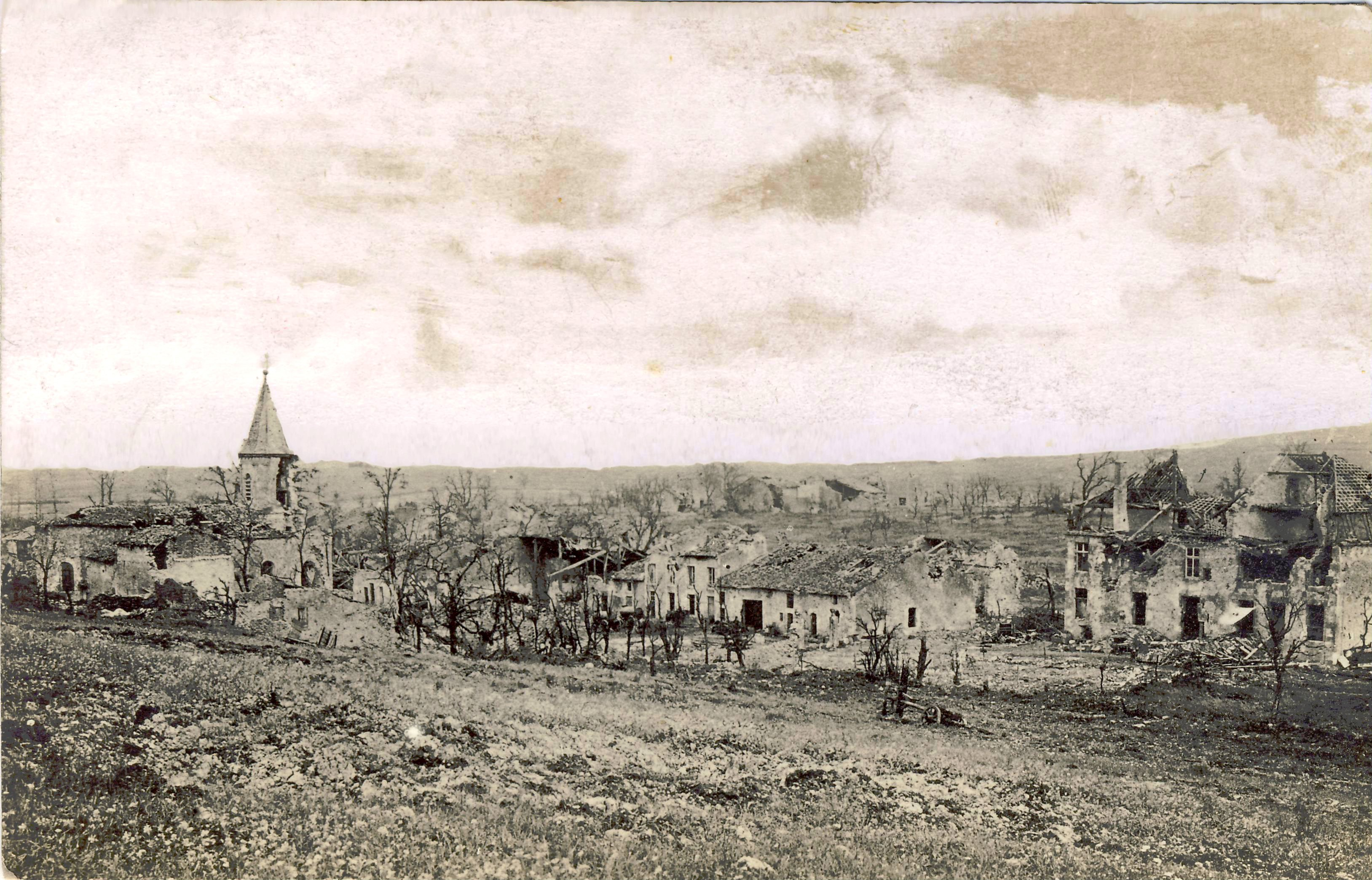
State after 9 August 1916

During the war, the town was destroyed and the land was made uninhabitable to such an extent that a decision was made not to rebuild it. The site of the commune is maintained as a testimony to war and is officially designated as a "village that died for France" (in French: village mort pour la France). It is managed by a municipal council of three members appointed by the prefect of the Meuse department.

== See also ==
- Zone rouge (First World War)
- List of French villages destroyed in World War I
- Communes of the Meuse department
