= Fleury-devant-Douaumont =

- Commune
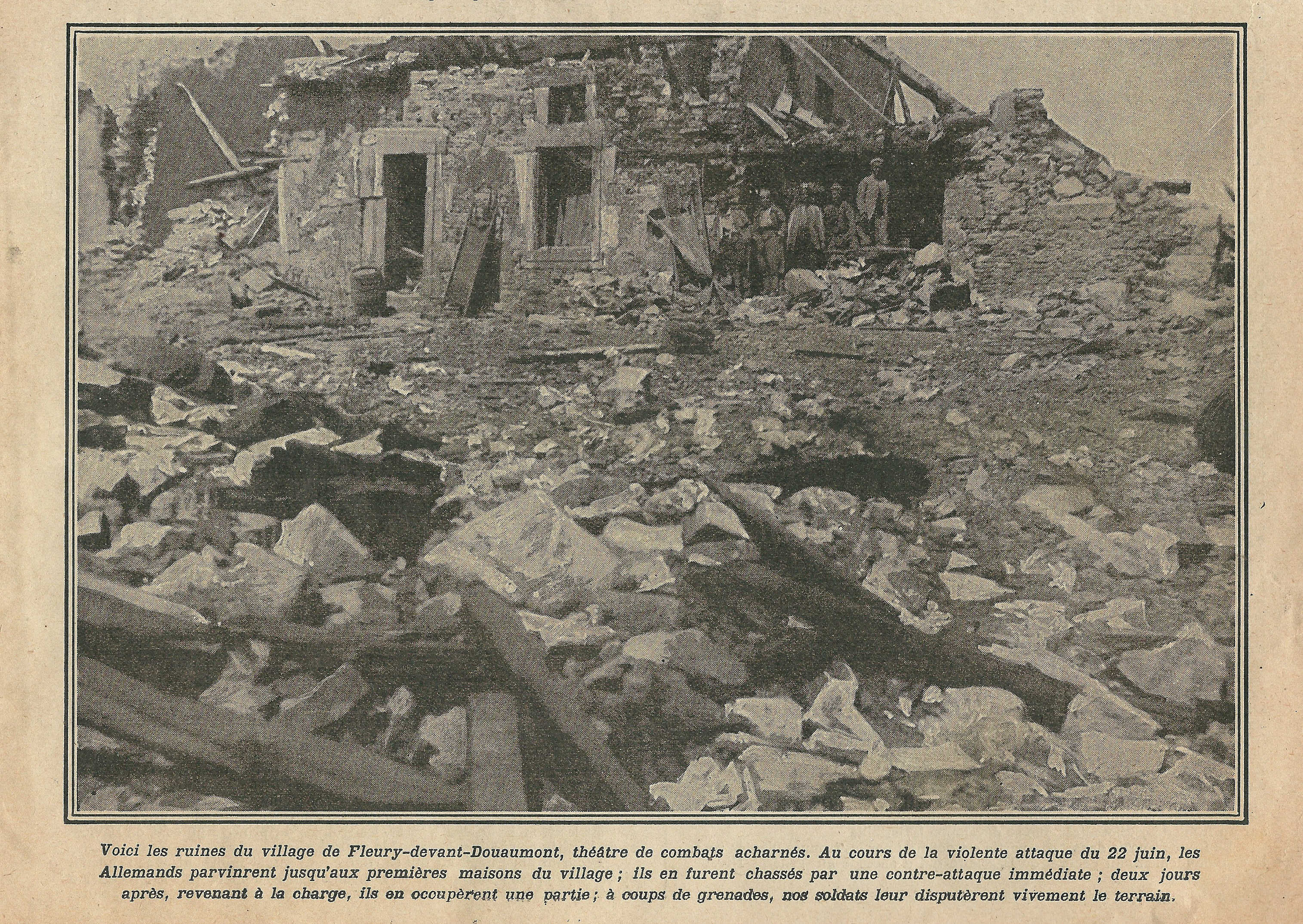
- Photo from Fleury-devant-Douaumont in June 1916

- Coat of arms
- Location of Fleury-devant-Douaumont
- Location within France Location within Grand Est
- Coordinates: 49°11′53″N 5°25′44″E
- Country: France
- Region: Grand Est
- Department: Meuse
- Arrondissement: Verdun
- Canton: Belleville-sur-Meuse
- Intercommunality: CA Grand Verdun

Government
  - Mayor (2020–2026): Jean-Pierre Laparra
- Area^{1}: 10.27 km^{2} (3.97 sq mi)
- Highest elevation: 390 m (1,280 ft)
- Lowest elevation: 227 m (745 ft)
- Population (2023): 0
  - Density: 0.0/km^{2} (0.0/sq mi)
- Time zone: UTC+01:00 (CET)
  - Summer (DST): UTC+02:00 (CEST)
- INSEE/Postal code: 55189 /55100
- ^{1} French Land Register data, which excludes lakes, ponds, glaciers > 1 km^{2} (0.386 sq mi or 247 acres) and river estuaries.

Fleury-devant-Douaumont (French pronunciation: [flœʁi dəvɑ̃ dwomɔ̃], literally Fleury before Douaumont) is a commune in the Meuse department in Grand Est in north-eastern France.

During the Battle of Verdun in 1916 it was captured and recaptured by the Germans and French 16 times, with all structures being completely destroyed. Since then, it has been declared to have "died for France", and thus remains unoccupied (official population: 0), as have the communes of Bezonvaux, Beaumont-en-Verdunois, Haumont-près-Samogneux, Louvemont-Côte-du-Poivre and Cumières-le-Mort-Homme.

== History ==
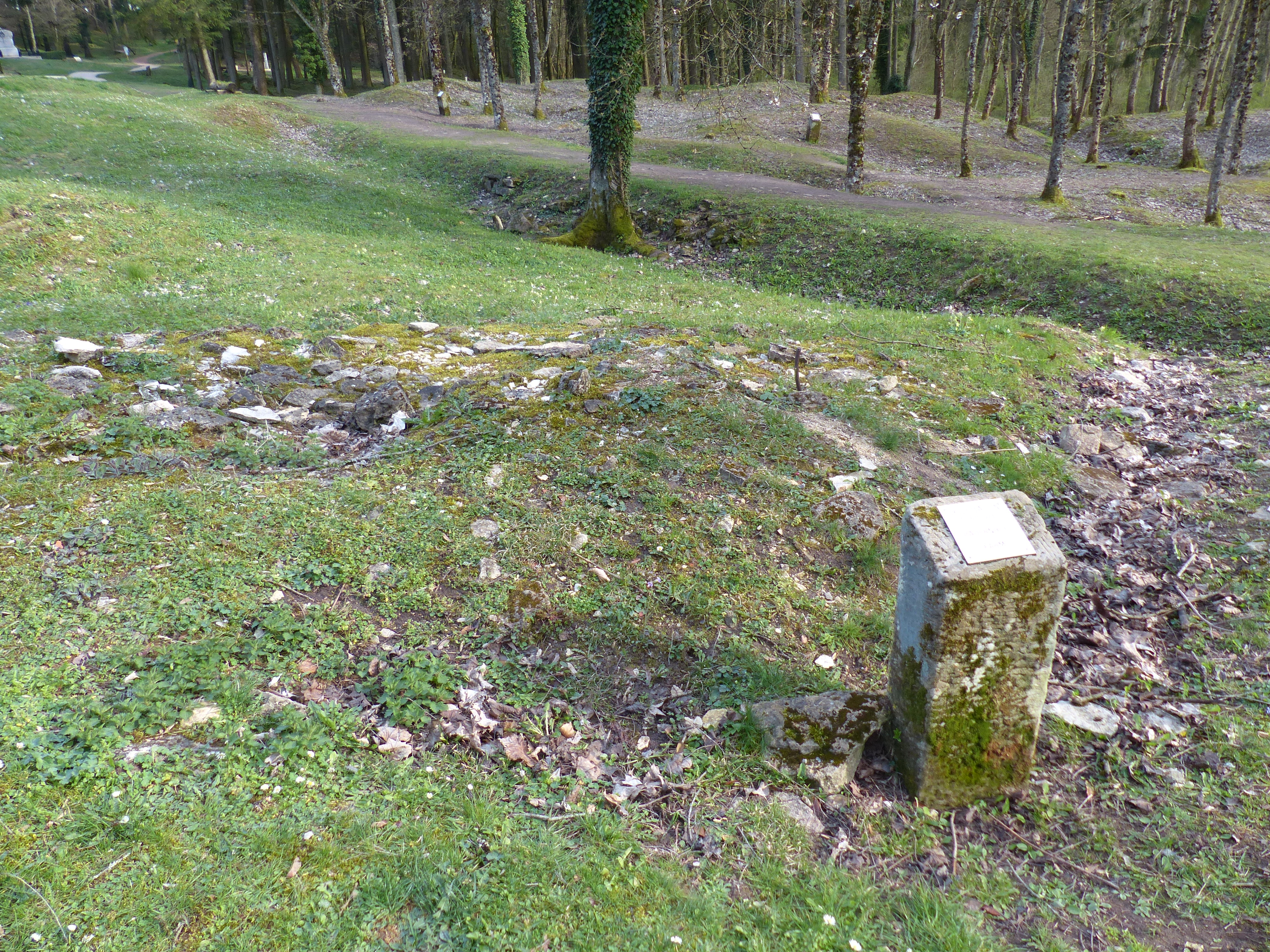
Image from the site of the village in 2019, with plaques showing the locations of buildings

During the war, the hamlet was completely destroyed and the land rendered so uninhabitable that officials decided not to rebuild it. As the land around was polluted with corpses, ammunition, explosives and poisonous gas, it was deemed too contaminated for farming to resume and declared a Zone rouge. The site is maintained as a testimony to war and is officially designated as a "village that died for France." It is managed by a municipal council of three members appointed by the prefect of the Meuse department.

Before the war, Fleury was a village of 422 engaged in agriculture and woodworking. Today, it is a wooded area next to the Verdun Memorial. Arrows guide visitors to where the streets and houses used to be.

== See also ==
- Zone rouge (First World War)
- List of French villages destroyed in World War I
- Communes of the Meuse department
