= Communes of France =

French territorial subdivision for municipalities

Communes of France (shown within the Departments of France)
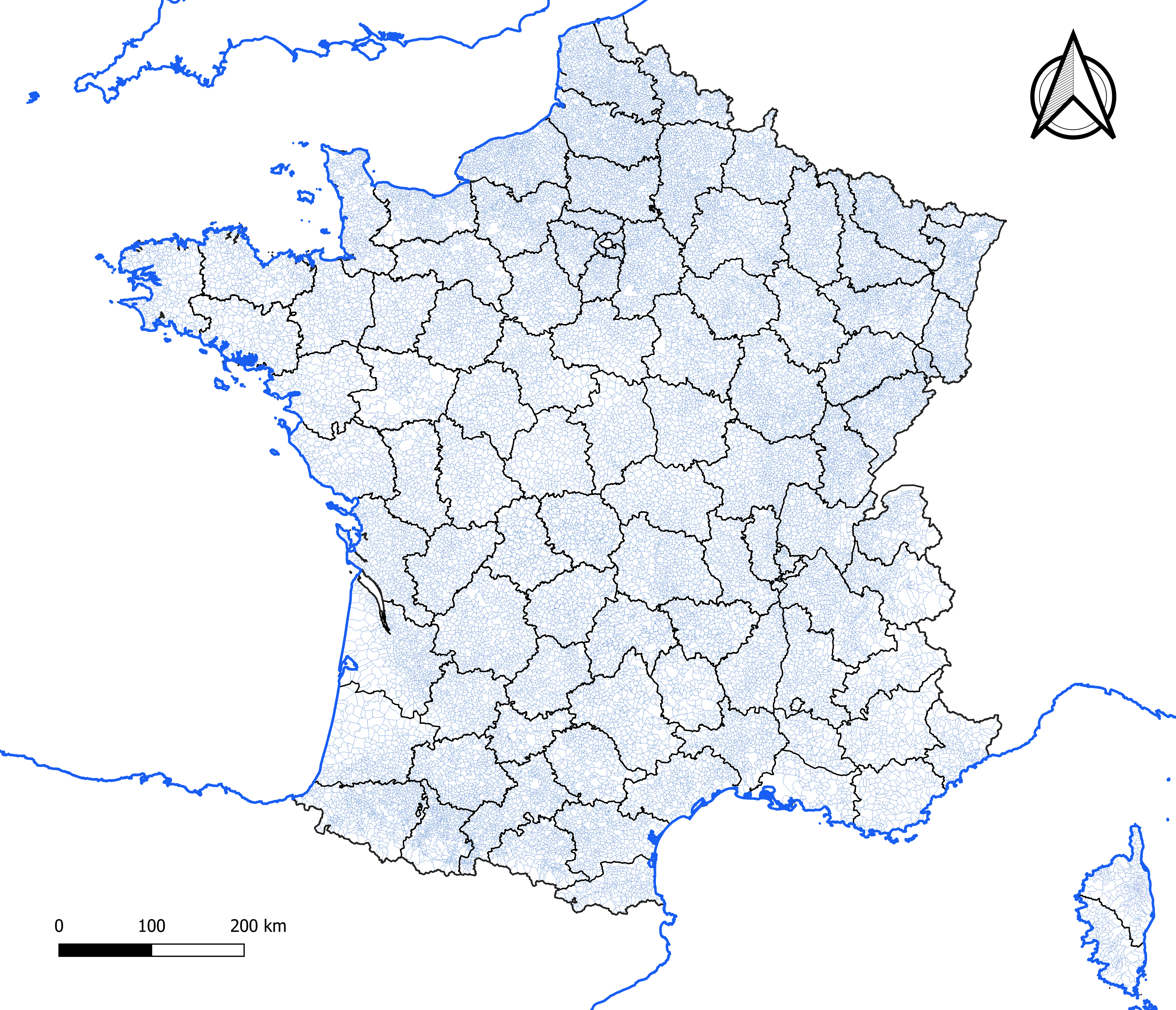
- Category: Municipality
- Location: France
- Found in: Departments
- Number: 34,965 (list); 34 875 collectivités (as of January 2021)
- Populations: 0 (Beaumont-en-Verdunois, Bezonvaux, Cumières-le-Mort-Homme, Fleury-devant-Douaumont, Haumont-près-Samogneux, and Louvemont-Côte-du-Poivre) – 2,175,601 (Paris)
- Areas: 0.04 km^{2} (Castelmoron-d'Albret) – 18,360 km^{2} (Maripasoula)
- Government: Municipal council

A commune (French pronunciation: [kɔmyn]) is a level of administrative division of France. French communes are analogous to civil townships and incorporated municipalities, and particularly to the New England towns, in Canada and the United States; Gemeinden in Germany; comuni in Italy; municipios in Spain; or civil parishes in the United Kingdom. Communes are based on historical geographic communities or villages and are vested with significant powers to manage the populations and land of the geographic area covered. The communes are the fourth-level administrative divisions of France.

Communes vary widely in size and area, from large sprawling cities with millions of inhabitants like Paris, to small hamlets with only a handful of inhabitants. Communes typically are based on pre-existing villages and facilitate local governance. All communes have names, but not all named geographic areas or groups of people residing together are communes (lieu dit or bourg), the difference residing in the lack of administrative powers. Except for the municipal arrondissements of its largest cities, the communes are the lowest level of administrative division in France and are governed by elected officials including a mayor (maire) and a municipal council (conseil municipal). They have extensive autonomous powers to implement national policy.

== Terminology ==
A commune is the smallest and oldest administrative division in France.

The French word commune appeared in the 12th century, from Medieval Latin communia, for a large gathering of people sharing a common life; from Latin communis, 'things held in common'.

== Characteristics ==
=== Number of communes ===
As of 1 January 2025, France comprises approximately 34,000 communes, including 129 overseas communes, reflecting a continuing trend of mergers and occasional separations since the 2010s. This is a considerably higher total than that of any other European country, because French communes still largely reflect the division of France into villages or parishes at the time of the French Revolution.

Evolution of the number of communes

	Metropolitan France^{(1)}	Overseas France^{(2)}
March 1861	37,510	n/a
March 1866	37,548	n/a
6 March 1921	37,963	n/a
7 March 1926	37,981	n/a
8 March 1931	38,004	n/a
8 March 1936	38,014	n/a
1 January 1947	37,983	n/a
10 May 1954	38,000	n/a
7 March 1962	37,962	n/a
1 March 1968	37,708	n/a
1 January 1971	37,659	n/a
20 February 1975	36,394	n/a
1 January 1978	36,382	n/a
1 March 1982	36,433	211

	Metropolitan France^{(1)}	Overseas France^{(2)}
1 March 1985	36,631	211
1 March 1990	36,551	212
1 January 1999	36,565	214
1 January 2000	36,567	214
1 January 2001	36,564	214
1 January 2002	36,566	214
1 January 2003	36,565	214
1 January 2004	36,569	214
1 January 2005	36,571	214
1 January 2006	36,572	214
1 January 2007	36,570	214
1 January 2008	36,569	212
1 January 2021	34,836	212

(1) Within the current limits of metropolitan France, which existed between 1860 and 1871 and from 1919 to today.
(2) Within the current extent of overseas France, which has remained unchanged since the independence of the New Hebrides in 1980.

=== Population of a typical commune ===
The median population of metropolitan France's communes at the 1999 census was 380 inhabitants. Again this is a very small number, and here France stands absolutely apart in Europe, with the lowest communes' median population of all the European countries (communes in Switzerland or Rhineland-Palatinate may cover a smaller area, as mentioned above, but they are more populated). This small median population of French communes can be compared with Italy, where the median population of communes in 2001 was 2,343 inhabitants, Belgium (11,265 inhabitants), or even Spain (564 inhabitants).

The median population given here should not hide the fact that there are pronounced differences in size among French communes. As mentioned in the introduction, a commune can be a city of 2 million inhabitants such as Paris, a town of 10,000 inhabitants, or just a hamlet of 10 inhabitants. What the median population tells us is that the vast majority of the French communes only have a few hundred inhabitants, but there are also a small number of communes with much higher populations.

In metropolitan France 57 percent of the 36,683 communes have fewer than 500 inhabitants and, with 4,638,000 inhabitants, these smaller communes constitute just 7.7 percent of the total population. In other words, just 8 percent of the French population live in 57 percent of its communes, whilst 92 percent are concentrated in the remaining 43 percent.

=== Example: Alsace ===
Alsace, with an area of 8,280 km^{2} (3,200 sq mi), and now part of the Région Grand Est, used to be the smallest of the regions of metropolitan France, and still has no fewer than 904 communes. This high number is typical of metropolitan France but is atypical when compared with other European countries. It shows the distinctive nature of the French commune as a geo-political or administrative entity.

With its 904 communes, Alsace has three times as many municipalities as Sweden, which has a much larger territory covering 449,964 km^{2} (173,732 sq mi) and yet is divided into only 290 municipalities (kommuner). Alsace has more than double the total number of municipalities of the Netherlands which, in spite of having a population nine times larger and a land area four times larger than Alsace, is divided into just 390 municipalities (gemeenten).

Most of the communes in Alsace, along with those in other regions of France, have rejected the central government's calls for mergers and rationalization. By way of contrast, in the German states bordering Alsace, the geo-political and administrative areas have been subject to various re-organizations from the 1960s onward. In the state of Baden-Württemberg, the number of Gemeinden or communities was reduced from 3,378 in 1968 to 1,108 in September 2007. In comparison, the number of communes in Alsace was only reduced from 946 in 1971 (just before the Marcellin law aimed at encouraging French communes to merge with each other was passed, see Current debate section below) to 904 in January 2007. Consequently, the Alsace region—despite having a land area only one-fifth the size and a total population only one-sixth of that of its neighbor Baden-Württemberg—has almost as many municipalities. The small Alsace region has more than double the number of municipalities compared to the large and populous state of North Rhine-Westphalia (396 Gemeinden in September 2007).

== Role ==
Despite differences in population, each of the communes of the French Republic possesses a mayor (maire) and a municipal council (conseil municipal), which jointly manage the commune from the municipal hall (mairie), with exactly the same powers no matter the size of the commune. This uniformity of status is a legacy of the French Revolution, which wanted to do away with the local idiosyncrasies and tremendous differences in status that existed in the kingdom of France.

French law makes allowances for the vast differences in commune size in a number of areas of administrative law. The size of the municipal council, the method of electing the municipal council, the maximum allowable pay of the mayor and deputy mayors, and municipal campaign finance limits (among other features) all depend on the population echelon into which a particular commune falls.

Since the PLM Law of 1982, three French communes also have a special status in that they are further divided into municipal arrondissements: these are Paris, Marseille, and Lyon. The municipal arrondissement is the only administrative unit below the commune in the French Republic but exists only in these three communes. These municipal arrondissements are not to be confused with the arrondissements that are subdivisions of French départements: French communes are considered legal entities, whereas municipal arrondissements, by contrast, have no official capacity and no budget of their own.

The rights and obligations of communes are governed by the Code général des collectivités territoriales (CGCT) which replaced the Code des communes (except for personnel matters) with the passage of the law of 21 February 1996 for legislation and decree number 2000-318 of 7 April 2000 for regulations.

From 1794 to 1977—except for a few months in 1848 and 1870–1871—Paris had no mayor and was thus directly controlled by the departmental prefect. This meant that Paris had less autonomy than certain towns or villages. Even after Paris regained the right to elect its own mayor in 1977, the central government retained control of the Paris police. In all other French communes, the municipal police are under the mayor's supervision.

== History ==
French communes were created at the beginning of the French Revolution in 1789–1790.

=== Kingdom of France ===
==== Parishes ====
Before the revolution, France's lowest level of administrative division was the parish (paroisse), and there were up to 60,000 of them in the kingdom. A parish consisted of a church building, the village, the cultivated land around the village. In the late 18th century, with 25 million inhabitants France was the most populous in Europe. By comparison, England had 6 million inhabitants. French kings ruled proudly over a "realm of 100,000 steeples".

Parishes lacked the municipal structures of post-Revolution communes. Usually, one contained only a building committee (conseil de fabrique), made up of villagers, which managed the buildings of the parish church, the churchyard, and the other numerous church estates and properties, and sometimes also provided help for the poor, or even administered parish hospitals or schools. Since the Ordinance of Villers-Cotterêts of 1539 by Francis I, the priest in charge of the parish was also required to record baptisms, marriages, and burials. Except for these tasks, villages were left to handle other issues as they pleased. Typically, villagers would gather to decide over a special issue regarding the community, such as agricultural land usage, but there existed no permanent municipal body. In many places, the local feudal lord (seigneur) still had a major influence in the village's affairs, collecting taxes from tenant-villagers and ordering them to work the corvée, controlling which fields were to be used and when, and how much of the harvest should be given to him.

==== Chartered cities ====
Additionally, some cities had obtained charters during the Middle Ages, either from the king himself or from local counts or dukes (such as the city of Toulouse chartered by the counts of Toulouse). These cities were made up of several parishes (up to c. 50 parishes in the case of Paris), and they were usually enclosed by a defensive wall. They had been emancipated from the power of feudal lords in the 12th and 13th centuries, had municipal bodies which administered the city, and bore some resemblance with the communes that the French Revolution would establish except for two key points:

- these municipal bodies were not democratic; they were usually in the hands of some rich bourgeois families upon whom, over time, nobility had been conferred, so they can be better labeled as oligarchies rather than municipal democracies.
- there was no uniform status for these chartered cities, each one having its own status and specific organization.

In the north, cities tended to be administered by échevins (from an old Germanic word meaning judge), while in the south, cities tended to be administered by consuls (in a clear reference to Roman antiquity), but Bordeaux was administered by jurats (etymologically meaning "sworn men") and Toulouse by capitouls ("men of the chapter"). Usually, there was no mayor in the modern sense; all the échevins or consuls were on equal footing, and rendered decisions collegially. However, for certain purposes, there was one échevin or consul ranking above the others, a sort of mayor, although not with the same authority and executive powers as a modern mayor. This "mayor" was called provost of the merchants (prévôt des marchands) in Paris and Lyon; maire in Marseille, Bordeaux, Rouen, Orléans, Bayonne and many other cities and towns; mayeur in Lille; premier capitoul in Toulouse; viguier in Montpellier; premier consul in many towns of southern France; prêteur royal in Strasbourg; maître échevin in Metz; maire royal in Nancy; or prévôt in Valenciennes.

=== French Revolution ===
On 14 July 1789, at the end of the afternoon, following the storming of the Bastille, the provost of the merchants of Paris, Jacques de Flesselles was shot by the crowd on the steps of Paris City Hall. Although in the Middle Ages the provosts of the merchants symbolized the independence of Paris and even had openly rebelled against King Charles V, their office had been suppressed by the king, then reinstated but with strict control from the king, and so they had ended up being viewed by the people as yet another representative of the king, no longer the embodiment of a free municipality.

Following that event, a "commune" of Paris was immediately set up to replace the old medieval chartered city of Paris, and a municipal guard was established to protect Paris against any attempt made by King Louis XVI to quell the ongoing revolution. Several other cities of France quickly followed suit, and communes arose everywhere, each with their municipal guard. On 14 December 1789, the National Assembly (Assemblée Nationale) passed a law creating the commune, designed to be the lowest level of administrative division in France, thus endorsing these independently created communes, but also creating communes of its own. In this area as in many others, the work of the National Assembly was, properly speaking, revolutionary: not content with transforming all the chartered cities and towns into communes, the National Assembly also decided to turn all the village parishes into full-status communes. The Revolutionaries were inspired by Cartesian ideas as well as by the philosophy of the Enlightenment. They wanted to do away with all the peculiarities of the past and establish a perfect society, in which all and everything should be equal and set up according to reason, rather than by tradition or conservatism.

Thus, they set out to establish administrative divisions that would be uniform across the country: the whole of France would be divided into départements, themselves divided into arrondissements, themselves divided into cantons, themselves divided into communes, no exceptions. All of these communes would have equal status, they would all have a mayor at their head and a municipal council elected by the inhabitants of the commune. This was a real revolution for the thousands of villages that never had experienced organized municipal life before. A communal house had to be built in each of these villages, which would house the meetings of the municipal council as well as the administration of the commune. Some in the National Assembly were opposed to such a fragmentation of France into thousands of communes, but eventually Mirabeau and his ideas of one commune for each parish prevailed.

On 20 September 1792, the recording of births, marriages, and deaths also was withdrawn as a responsibility of the priests of the parishes and handed to the mayors. Civil marriages were established and started to be performed in the mairie with a ceremony not unlike the traditional one, with the mayor replacing the priest, and the name of the law replacing the name of God ("Au nom de la loi, je vous déclare unis par les liens du mariage." – "In the name of the law, I declare you united by the bonds of marriage."). Priests were forced to surrender their centuries-old baptism, marriage, and burial books, which were deposited in the mairies. These abrupt changes profoundly alienated devout Catholics, and France soon was plunged into the throes of civil war, with the fervently religious regions of western France at its center. It would take Napoleon I to re-establish peace in France, stabilize the new administrative system, and make it generally accepted by the population. Napoleon also abolished the election of the municipal councils, which now were chosen by the prefect, the local representative of the central government.

=== Trends after the French Revolution ===
Today, French communes are still very much the same in their general principles as those that were established at the beginning of the Revolution. The biggest changes occurred in 1831, when the French Parliament re-established the principle of the election of municipal councils, and in 1837 when French communes were given legal "personality", being now considered legal entities with legal capacity. The Jacobin revolutionaries were afraid of independent local powers, which they saw as conservative and opposed to the revolution, and so they favored a powerful central state. Therefore, when they created the communes, they deprived them of any legal "personality" (as they did with the départements), with only the central state having legal "personality." By 1837 that situation was judged impractical, as mayors and municipal councils could not be parties in courts. The consequence of the change, however, was that tens of thousands of villages which had never had legal "personality" (contrary to the chartered cities) suddenly became legal entities for the first time in their history. This is still the case today.

During the revolution, approximately 41,000 communes were created, on territory corresponding to the limits of modern-day France (the 41,000 figure includes the communes of the departments of Savoie, Haute-Savoie and Alpes-Maritimes which were annexed in 1795, but does not include the departments of modern-day Belgium and Germany west of the Rhine, which were part of France between 1795 and 1815). This was fewer than the 60,000 parishes that existed before the revolution (in cities and towns, parishes were merged into one single commune; in the countryside, some very small parishes were merged with bigger ones), but 41,000 was still a considerable number, without any comparison in the world at the time, except in the empire of China (but there, only county level and above had any permanent administration).

Since then, tremendous changes have affected France, as they have the rest of Europe: the Industrial Revolution, two world wars, and the rural exodus have all depopulated the countryside and increased the size of cities. French administrative divisions, however, have remained extremely rigid and unchanged. Today about 90 percent of communes and departments are exactly the same as those designed at the time of the French Revolution more than 200 years ago, with the same limits. Countless rural communes that had hundreds of inhabitants at the time of the French Revolution now have only a hundred inhabitants or fewer. On the other hand, cities and towns have grown so much that their urbanized area is now extending far beyond the limits of their commune which were set at the time of the revolution. The most extreme example of this is Paris, where the urbanized area sprawls over 396 communes.

Paris in fact was one of the very few communes of France whose limits were extended to take into account the expansion of the urbanized area. The new, larger, commune of Paris was set up under the oversight of Emperor Napoléon III in 1859, but after 1859 the limits of Paris rigidified. Unlike most other European countries, which stringently merged their communes to better reflect modern-day densities of population (such as Germany and Italy around 1970), dramatically decreasing the number of communes in the process – the Gemeinden of West Germany were decreased from 24,400 to 8,400 in the space of a few years – France only carried out mergers at the margin, and those were mostly carried out during the 19th century. From 41,000 communes at the time of the French Revolution, the number decreased to 37,963 in 1921, to 36,569 in 2008 (in metropolitan France).

Thus, in Europe, only Switzerland has as high a density of communes as France, and even there an extensive merger movement has started in the last 10 years. To better grasp the staggering number of communes in France, two comparisons can be made: First, of the original 15 member states of the European Union there are approximately 75,000 communes; France alone, which comprises 16 percent of the population of the EU-15, had nearly half of its communes. Second, the United States, with a territory fourteen times larger than that of the French Republic, and nearly five times its population, had 35,937 incorporated municipalities and townships at the 2002 Census of Governments, fewer than that of the French Republic. The number of barangays in the Philippines, villages of Indonesia, and muban in Thailand also have a higher number than the French communes.

=== Communes nouvelles ===
There have long been calls in France for large-scale mergers of communes, including from prominent voices such as the president of the Cour des comptes (the national audit office). In 1971, the Marcellin law offered financial incentives to encourage voluntary mergers, but had limited success—only about 1,300 communes agreed to merge. Many rural communes with small populations struggle to provide basic services such as running water, garbage collection, and road maintenance.

Mergers remain difficult to achieve. One reason is that they reduce the number of elected positions, which can make them unpopular with local politicians. In some cases, residents are reluctant to let their local services be managed by officials based in another village, especially if they feel their specific needs may not be well understood.

In December 2010, the law n° 2010-1563 created the legal framework for the communes nouvelles ("new communes"). A commune nouvelle can be created when several communes merge, either at the request of their municipal councils or at the initiative of the prefect. The new commune may choose to establish communes déléguées ("delegated communes") to preserve some local representation through a delegated mayor and council.

Between 2012 and 2021, around 820 communes nouvelles were created, replacing about 2,550 former communes. The trend has continued in recent years. As of 1 January 2024, a total of 1,078 communes nouvelles had been created since 2010, replacing more than 3,000 former communes.

In 2024 alone, 46 communes nouvelles were created, formed from the merger of 110 existing communes. In rare cases, a few communes that had previously merged chose to regain their independence—such as four communes in the Cantal department in 2024—following local referendums and prefectural approval.

=== Intercommunality ===
The expression "intercommunality" (intercommunalité) denotes several forms of cooperation between communes. Such cooperation first made its appearance at the end of the 19th century in the form of a law on 22 March 1890, which provided for the establishment of single-purpose intercommunal associations. French lawmakers have long been aware of the inadequacy of the communal structure inherited from the French Revolution for dealing with a number of practical matters. The so-called Chevènement law of 12 July 1999 is a relatively recent and thoroughgoing measure aimed at strengthening and simplifying this principle.

In recent years it has become increasingly common for communes to band together in intercommunal consortia for the provision of such services as refuse collection and water supply. Suburban communes often team up with the city at the core of their urban area to form a community charged with managing public transport or even administering the collection of local taxes.

The Chevènement law tidied up all these practices, abolishing some structures and creating new ones. In addition, it offered central government finance aimed at encouraging further communes to join in intercommunal structures. Unlike the only partially successful statute enacted in 1966 and enabling urban communes to form urban communities or the more marked failure of the Marcellin law of 1971, the Chevènement law met with a large measure of success, so that a majority of French communes are now involved in intercommunal structures.

There are two types of these structures:

- Those without fiscal power, the loosest form of intercommunality. Mainly in this category are the traditional syndicates of communes. Communes gather and contribute financially to the syndicate, but the syndicate cannot levy its own taxes. Communes can leave the syndicate at any time. Syndicates can be set up for a particular purpose or to deal with several simultaneous matters. These structures have been left untouched by the Chevènement law, and they are on the decline.
- Structures with fiscal power. This is what the Chevènement law was concerned with, and it distinguished three structures with fiscal power:
  - the community of communes (communauté de communes), aimed primarily at rural communes;
  - the community of agglomeration (communauté d'agglomération), aimed at towns and middle-sized cities and their suburbs;
  - the urban community (communauté urbaine), aimed at larger cities and their suburbs.
  - the metropolis (métropole), established in 2014, aimed at the largest cities and their suburbs.

These three structures are given varying levels of fiscal power, with the community of agglomeration and the urban community having the most fiscal power, levying the local tax on corporations (taxe professionnelle) in their own name instead of those of the communes, and with the same level of taxation across the communes of the community. The communities must also manage some services previously performed by the communes, such as garbage collection or transport, but the law also makes it mandatory for the communities to manage other areas such as economic planning and development, housing projects, or environment protection. Communities of communes are required to manage the fewest areas, leaving the communes more autonomous, while urban communities are required to manage most matters, leaving the communes within them with less autonomy.

==== Allocation of government money ====
In exchange for the creation of a community, the government allocates money to them based on their population, thus providing an incentive for communes to team up and form communities. Communities of communes are given the least money per inhabitant, whereas urban communities are given the most money per inhabitant, thus pushing communes to form more integrated communities where they have fewer powers, which they might otherwise have been loath to do if it were not for government money.

The Chevènement law has been extremely successful in the sense that a majority of French communes now have joined the new intercommunal structures. On 1 January 2007, there were 2,573 such communities in metropolitan France (including five syndicats d'agglomération nouvelle, a category currently being phased out), made up of 33,327 communes (91.1 percent of all the communes of metropolitan France), and 52.86 million inhabitants, i.e., 86.7 percent of the population of metropolitan France.

In urban areas, the new intercommunal structures are much more a reality, being created by local decision-makers out of genuine belief in the worth of working together. However, in many places, local feuds have arisen, and it was not possible to set up an intercommunal structure for the whole of the urban area: some communes refusing to take part in it, or even creating their own structure. In some urban areas like Marseille there exist four distinct intercommunal structures! In many areas, rich communes have joined with other rich communes and have refused to let in poorer communes, for fear that their citizens would be overtaxed to the benefit of poorer suburbs.

Moreover, intercommunal structures in many urban areas are still new, and fragile: Tensions exist between communes; the city at the center of the urban area often is suspected of wishing to dominate the suburban communes; communes from opposing political sides also may be suspicious of each other.

Two famous examples of this are Toulouse and Paris. In Toulouse, on top of there being six intercommunal structures, the main community of Toulouse and its suburbs is only a community of agglomeration, although Toulouse is large enough to create an Urban Community according to the law. This is because the suburban communes refused an urban community for fear of losing too much power, and opted for a community of agglomeration, despite the fact that a community of agglomeration receives less government funds than an urban community. As for Paris, no intercommunal structure has emerged there, the suburbs of Paris fearing the concept of a "Greater Paris", and so disunity still is the rule in the metropolitan area, with the suburbs of Paris creating many different intercommunal structures all without the city.

One major often raised problem with intercommunality, is the fact that the intercommunal structures are not subject to direct election by the people, so it is the representatives of each individual commune that sit in the new structure. As a consequence, civil servants and bureaucrats are the ones setting up the agenda and implementing it, with the elected representatives of the communes only endorsing key decisions.

== Classification ==
INSEE (Institut National de la Statistique et des Études Économiques) gives numerical indexing codes to various entities in France, notably the communes (which do not coincide with postcodes). The complete code has eight digits and three spaces within, but there is a popular simplified code with five digits and no space within:

- Two digits (department) and three digits (commune) for the 96 departments of metropolitan France.
- Three digits (department or collectivity) and two digits (commune) for the Overseas departments, Overseas collectivities and Overseas countries.

== Administration ==
The whole territory of the French Republic is divided into communes; even uninhabited mountains or rain forests are dependent on a commune for their administration. This is unlike some other countries, such as the United States, where unincorporated areas directly governed by a county or a higher authority can be found. There are only a few exceptions:

- COM (collectivité d'outre-mer, i.e., overseas collectivity) of Saint-Martin (33,102 inhabitants). It was previously a commune inside the Guadeloupe région. The commune structure was abolished when Saint-Martin became an overseas collectivity on 22 February 2007.
- COM of Wallis and Futuna (14,944 inhabitants), which still is divided according to the three traditional chiefdoms.
- COM of Saint Barthélemy (6,852 inhabitants). It was previously a commune inside the Guadeloupe region. The commune structure was abolished when Saint-Barthélemy became an overseas collectivity on 22 February 2007.

Furthermore, two regions without permanent habitation have no communes:

- TOM (territoire d'outre-mer, i.e., overseas territory) of the French Southern and Antarctic Lands (no permanent population, about 200 resident scientists, soldiers, and meteorologists)
- Clipperton Island in the Pacific Ocean (uninhabited)

Each commune has a municipal council (conseil municipal) composed of municipal councilors (conseillers municipaux). The municipal council is the legislative and deliberative organ of the commune. The municipal councilors are elected by the inhabitants of the commune for a 6-year term. Each commune is governed by a mayor (maire) elected for a 6-year term.

== Miscellaneous facts ==
=== Most and least populous communes ===
- Paris is the most populous commune (Note: Since 2019, Paris is administratively not a commune, but a collectivity with particular status, which holds the attributions of both a commune and a department.) of France with 2,048,472 residents as of 2025.
- Six of the French villages destroyed in the First World War have never been rebuilt. All are found in the département of Meuse and were destroyed during the Battle of Verdun in 1916. After the war, it was decided that the land previously occupied by the destroyed villages would not be incorporated into other communes, as a testament to these villages which had "died for France", as they were declared, and to preserve their memory. The following communes are entirely unpopulated and are managed by a council of three members, appointed by the prefect of Meuse:
  - Beaumont-en-Verdunois
  - Bezonvaux
  - Cumières-le-Mort-Homme
  - Fleury-devant-Douaumont
  - Haumont-près-Samogneux
  - Louvemont-Côte-du-Poivre
- Apart from the above cases, the communes with the fewest inhabitants in the French Republic are:
  - commune of Rochefourchat (Drôme), in southeastern France, one inhabitant as of 2021.
  - commune of Leménil-Mitry (Meurthe-et-Moselle), in eastern France, two inhabitants as of 2021.
  - commune of La Bâtie-des-Fonds (Drôme), three inhabitants as of 2021.

=== Most and least subdivided departments ===
- Pas-de-Calais is the department in France with the most communes, with 890.
- Paris is the department in France with the fewest communes, with only single commune of an arrondissement and the department itself.

=== Largest and smallest commune territories ===
- The largest commune of the French Republic is Maripasoula (with 3,710 inhabitants) in the département of French Guiana: 18,360 square kilometres (7,090 sq mi).
- The smallest commune of the French Republic is Castelmoron-d'Albret (53 inhabitants) near Bordeaux: 3.54 hectares (8.75 acres).
- In metropolitan France the largest commune is the commune of Arles (50,513 inhabitants) near Marseille, the territory of which encompasses most of the Camargue (the delta of the Rhône): 8.7 times the area of the city of Paris (excluding the outlying parks of Bois de Boulogne and Bois de Vincennes) at 759 square kilometres (293 sq mi).

=== Communes farthest away from the capital city of France ===
- The commune of the French Republic farthest away from Paris is the commune of L'Île-des-Pins (1,840 inhabitants) in New Caledonia: 16,841 km (10,465 miles) from the center of Paris.
- In continental France (i.e., European France excluding Corsica), the communes farthest away from Paris are Coustouges (93 inhabitants) and Lamanère (52 inhabitants) at the Spanish border: both at 721 km (448 mi) from the center of Paris.

=== Shortest and longest commune names ===
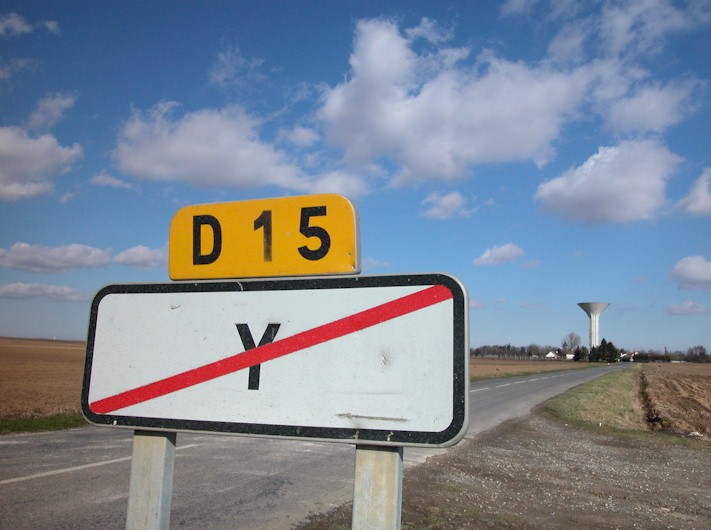
Road sign marking the end of the village of Y in the Somme department of Hauts-de-France

- The commune of the French Republic with the shortest name is the commune of Y in Somme (91 inhabitants).
- The two communes in the French Republic with the longest composite names (38 letters):
  - Saint-Remy-en-Bouzemont-Saint-Genest-et-Isson in Marne (517 inhabitants)
  - Beaujeu-Saint-Vallier-Pierrejux-et-Quitteur in Haute-Saône (937 inhabitants)
- The two communes in the French Republic with the longest single word names (20 letters):
  - Niederschaeffolsheim in Bas-Rhin (1325 inhabitants)
  - Mittelschaeffolsheim in Bas-Rhin (565 inhabitants)

=== Communes with non-French names ===
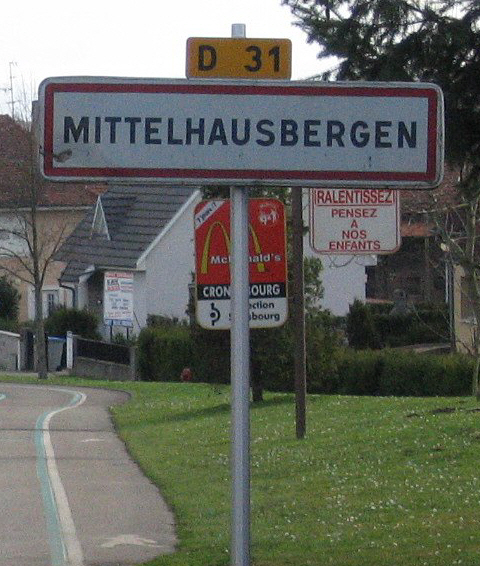
Mittelhausbergen in Alsace

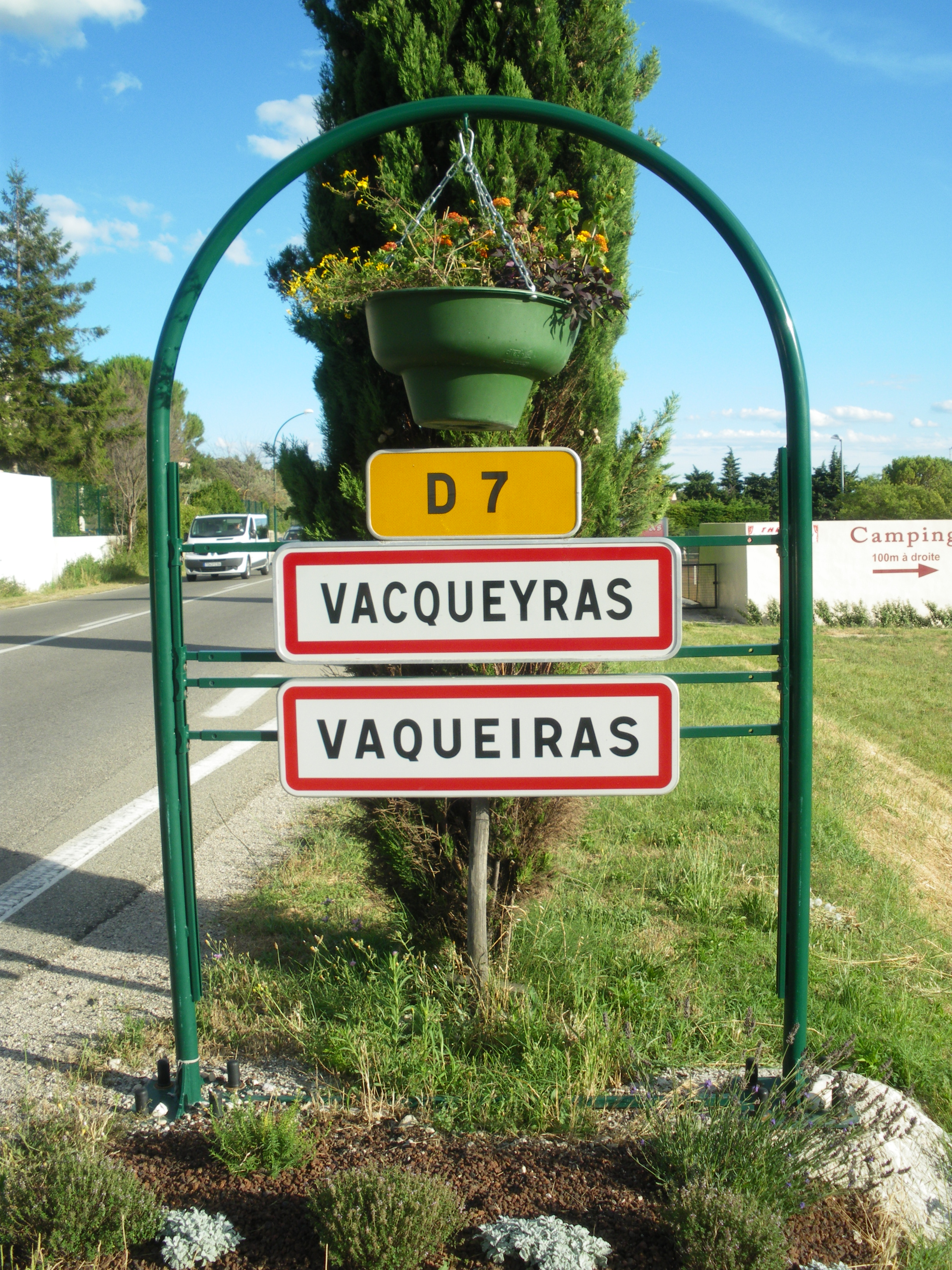
Vacqueyras in Provence, showing double French/ Provençal name

In areas where languages other than French are or were spoken, most place-names have been translated into a French spelling and pronunciation, such as Dunkerque (Duinkerke in Dutch), Toulouse (Tolosa in Occitan), Strasbourg (Straßburg in German), Perpignan (Perpinyà in Catalan), and many place names derived from Gaulish or Latin. However, many smaller communes have retained their native name. Other examples of retained names in the languages once spoken, or still spoken, on French territory:

- Alsatian: the commune of Mittelhausbergen (1,680 inhabitants)
- Amerindian: the commune of Kourou (19,107 inhabitants)
- Arpitan: the commune of Chamonix (9,514 inhabitants)
- Austronesian: the commune of Kouaoua (1,586 inhabitants)
- Basque: the commune of Ainhoa (683 inhabitants)
- Breton: the commune of Brest (141,315 inhabitants)
- Catalan: the commune of Banyuls-dels-Aspres (1,007 inhabitants)
- Comorian: the commune of M’Tsangamouji (5,028 inhabitants)
- Corsican: the commune of Calvi (5,377 inhabitants)
- Dutch: the commune of Steenvoorde (4,024 inhabitants)
- Italian: the commune of Bocognano (372 inhabitants)
- Occitan: the commune of Alès (41,205 inhabitants)
- Polynesian: the commune of Hitiaa O Te Ra (8,683 inhabitants)

== See also ==
- Lists of communes of France
- Comune (Italy)
- Urban areas France
- National Powder Factory of Ripault
- Châteliers oppidum
