= Samogneux =

- Commune
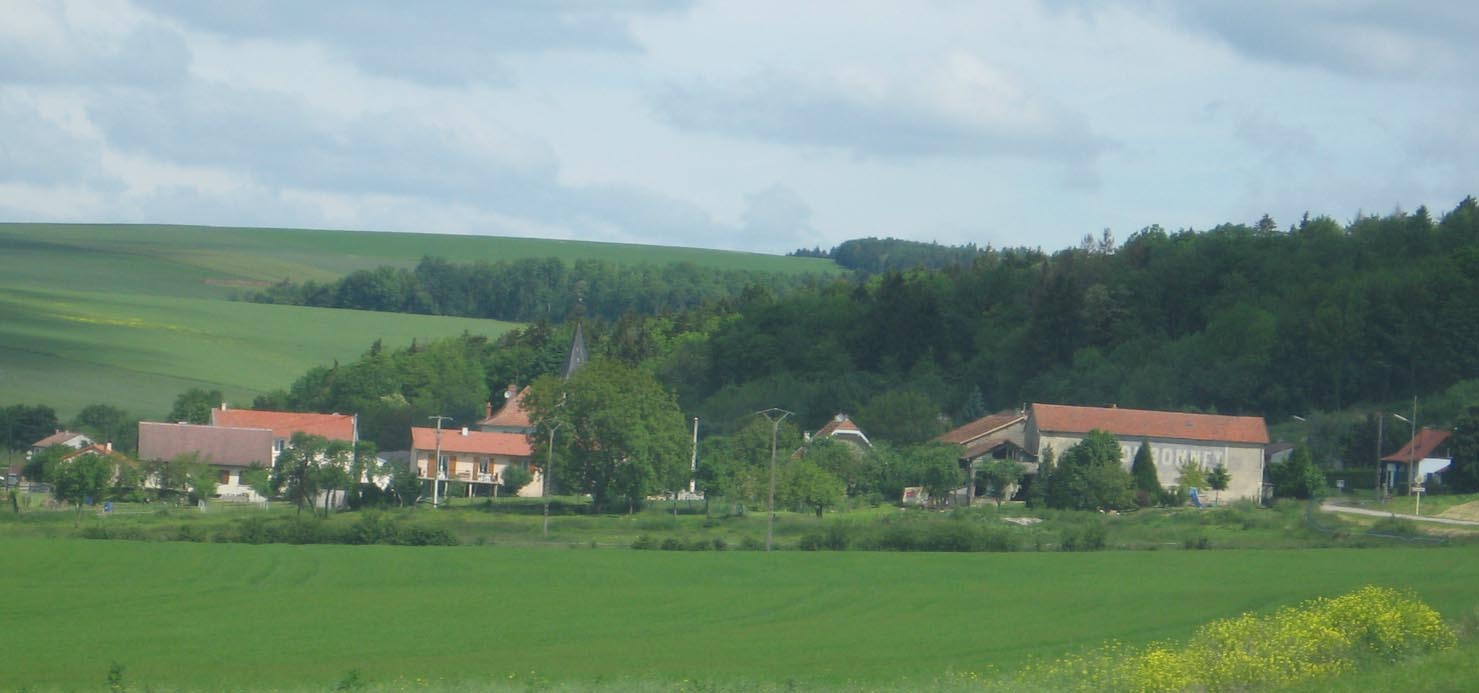
- A general view Samogneux
- Location of Samogneux
- Location within France Location within Grand Est
- Coordinates: 49°15′20″N 5°20′20″E
- Country: France
- Region: Grand Est
- Department: Meuse
- Arrondissement: Verdun
- Canton: Belleville-sur-Meuse
- Intercommunality: CA Grand Verdun

Government
  - Mayor (2020–2026): Jean-Marie Addenet
- Area^{1}: 6.16 km^{2} (2.38 sq mi)
- Elevation: 215 m (705 ft)
- Highest elevation: 318 m (1,043 ft)
- Lowest elevation: 181 m (594 ft)
- Population (2023): 97
  - Density: 16/km^{2} (41/sq mi)
- Time zone: UTC+01:00 (CET)
  - Summer (DST): UTC+02:00 (CEST)
- INSEE/Postal code: 55468 /55100
- ^{1} French Land Register data, which excludes lakes, ponds, glaciers > 1 km^{2} (0.386 sq mi or 247 acres) and river estuaries.

Samogneux (French pronunciation: [samɔɲø]) is a commune in the Meuse department in Grand Est in north-eastern France.

== See also ==
- Communes of the Meuse department
