= Zone rouge =

Environmentally devastated WWI battlefields in France

Map showing conditions immediately following the war: totally destroyed areas in red, areas of major damage in yellow, moderately damaged areas in green, and undamaged areas in blue

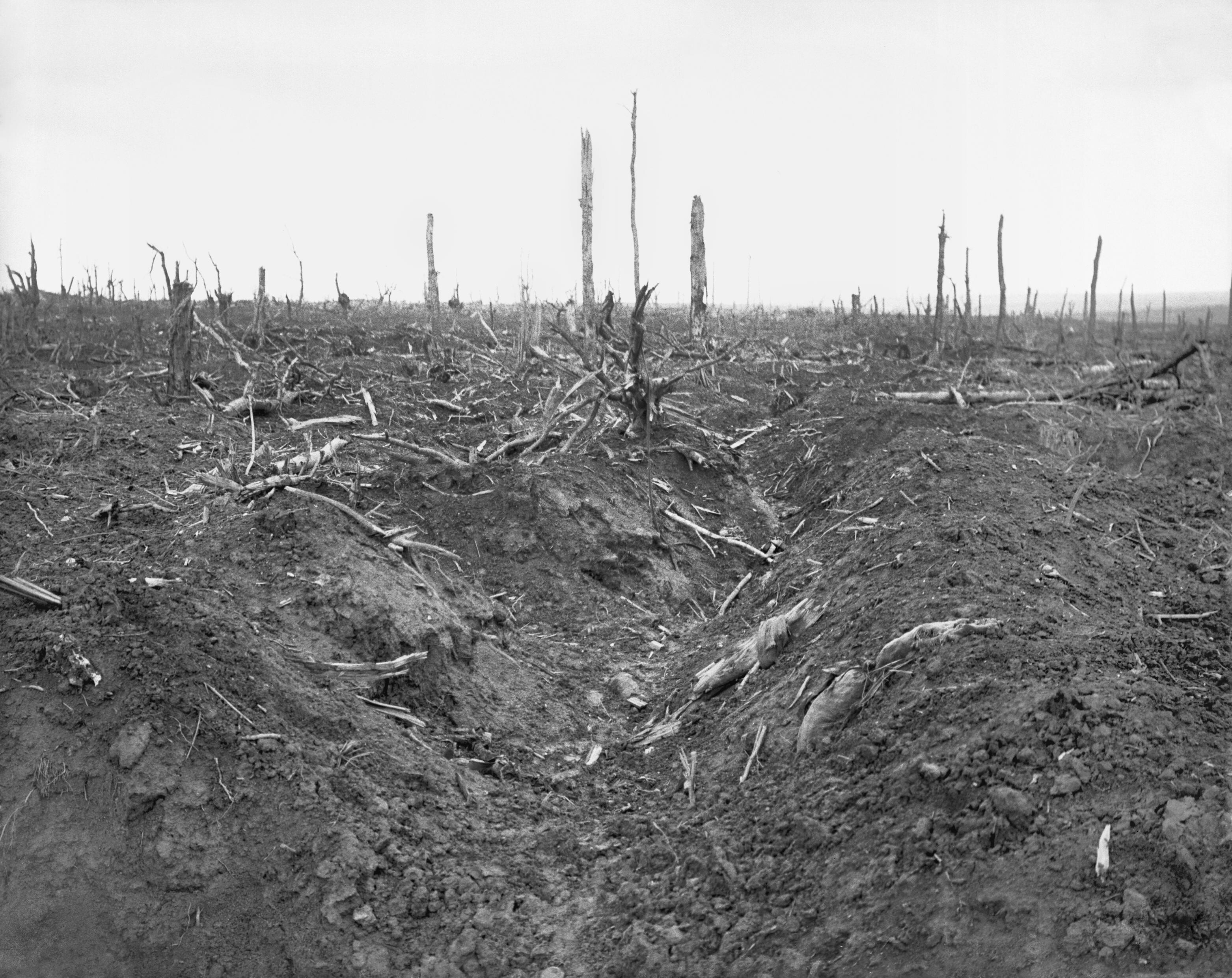
A German trench at Delville Wood, near Longueval (Somme), that was destroyed in 1916 in the zone rouge

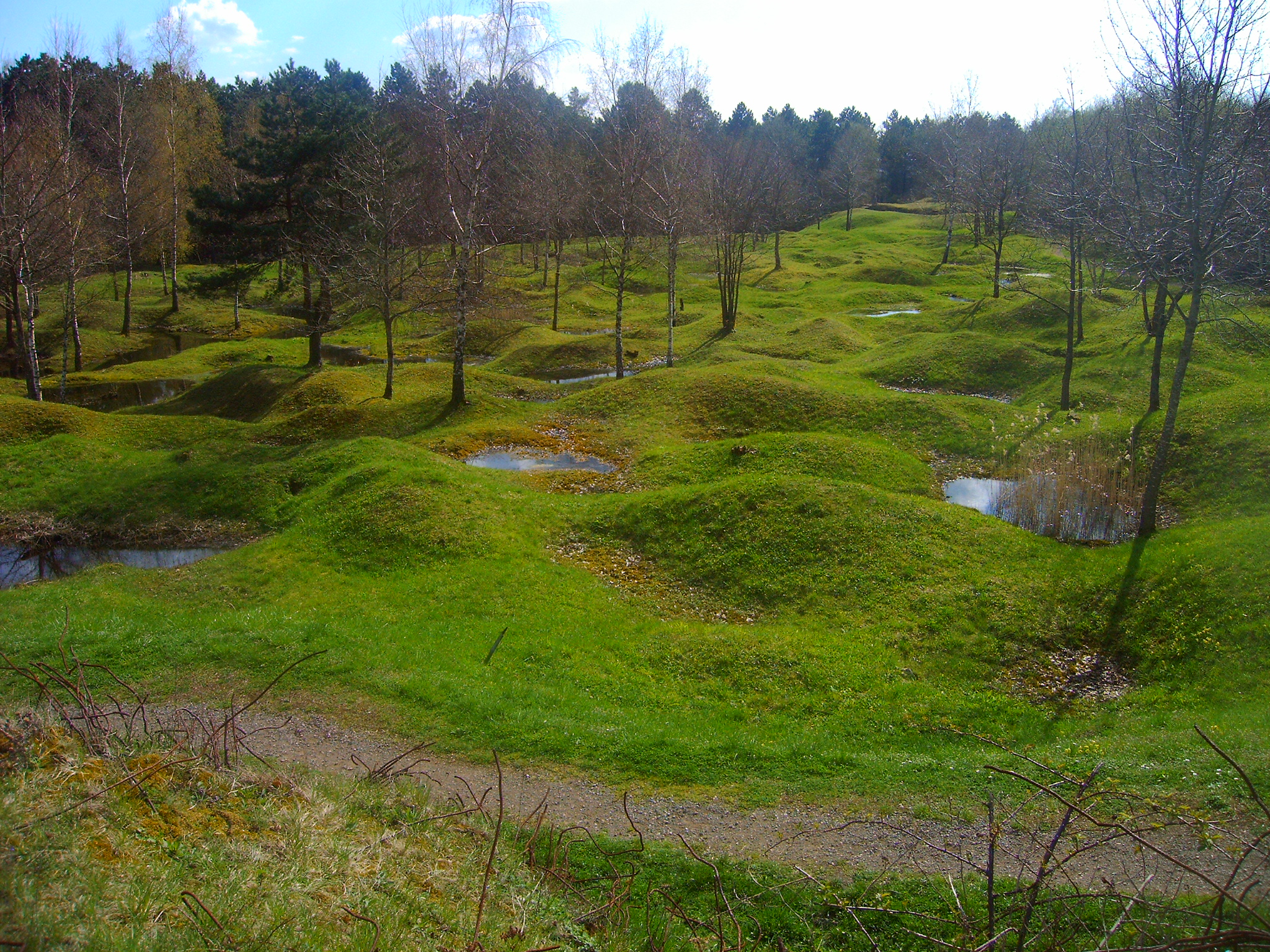
Verdun battlefield showing bombturbation (2005)

The Zone rouge (French for 'Red Zone') is a chain of non-contiguous areas throughout northeastern France that the French government isolated after the First World War. The land, which originally covered more than 1,200 square kilometres (460 square miles), was deemed too physically and environmentally damaged by conflict for human habitation. Rather than attempt to immediately clean up the former battlefields, the land was allowed to return to nature. Restrictions within the Zone rouge still exist today, although the control areas have been greatly reduced.

The Zone Rouge was defined just after the war as "Completely devastated. Damage to properties: 100%. Damage to Agriculture: 100%. Impossible to clean. Human life impossible".

Under French law, activities such as housing, farming, or forestry were temporarily or permanently forbidden in the Zone rouge, because of the vast amounts of human and animal remains, and millions of items of unexploded ordnance contaminating the land. Some towns and villages were never permitted to be rebuilt after the war, such as Fleury-devant-Douaumont. As part of war reparations, Pinus nigra trees sent by Austria were planted in some parts of the zone.

== Historical context ==
World War I's massive scale of industrially produced ammunition left France, Belgium and Germany with severe chemical and ecological consequences. In France, where the fighting was concentrated, this resulted in approximately 7% of French metropolitan territory being almost totally destroyed. This brought about significant reform, particularly towards laws of war.

As early as 1914, by a statute enacted unanimously, France committed to fully compensating those who suffered war damages (French: dommages de guerre). Five months after the 1918 armistice, after lengthy discussions and debates between senators and deputies, the French Parliament enacted the Charte des sinistrés, 'Charter of disaster victims' dealing with war damages. It authorised the French government to buy land that seemed unable to be restored quickly or permanently. The government under President Georges Clemenceau required the prefects of the affected areas to take over the affected lands, with compensation to the owners or heirs of the plots of land. The prefects carried out this duty along with the relevant departments, including the Directorate of Agricultural Services and the Forest Conservation Office.

Some of the buried, abandoned or lost militaria in the Zone rouge is responsible for polluting the environment to a chronic extent, which in addition to the consequences from the firing of shells, explosions, use of chemical weapons, and many fires, leads to a considerable amount of pollution in the region and its surroundings.

After the armistice, the demining process led to large amounts of shells and other unexploded ordnance. These were disposed of either by illegal dumping or by burning the contents in makeshift incinerators and retrieving the metals.

In addition to the damage to the land in the Zone rouge, an immense source of pollution was created by discharging 35,000 tonnes of shells recovered in Belgium and northern France into the sea off the coast of Zeebrugge, in water a few metres deep. This practice of dumping weapons into the sea was resumed following the end of World War II.

Ninety years after the Great War, ecological irregularities persist in the eleven departments where the Zone rouge occurs (spanning two regions). The green and yellow zones can also be affected. However, it is the departments in the Zone rouge, notably Meuse, Pas-de-Calais, Nord and Somme, which are by far the most damaged. Specialists still observe a lesser presence and diversity of mushrooms, lichens and a significant number of plants and animals. Although this is partly due to other factors (agriculture, eco-landscape fragmentation, industrial and urban pollution), the magnitude of the ecological aftereffects of the Western Front remains open.

== Main dangers ==
The areas are saturated with unexploded shells (including many gas shells), grenades, and rusting ammunition. Soils were heavily polluted by lead, mercury, chlorine, arsenic, various dangerous gases, acids, and human and animal remains. The area was also littered with ammunition depots and chemical plants. The land of the Western Front is covered in old trenches and shell holes.

Each year, numerous unexploded shells are recovered from former WWI battlefields in what is known as the iron harvest. According to the Sécurité Civile, the French agency in charge of the land management of Zone rouge, 300 to 700 more years at this current rate will be needed to clean the area completely. Some experiments conducted in 2005–2006 discovered up to 300 shells per hectare (120 per acre) in the top 15 centimetres (6 inches) of soil in the worst areas.

Some areas still remain heavily contaminated. For example, at a site in the vicinity of Verdun known as the Place à Gaz (49.2968°N 5.5352°E), arsenic constitutes up to 176 grams per kilogram (18%) in the soil. In the 1920s, chemical warfare shells containing arsenic were destroyed there by thermal treatment.

== See also ==
- List of French villages destroyed in World War I
- Iron harvest
- Passive rewilding
