= Damloup =

- Commune
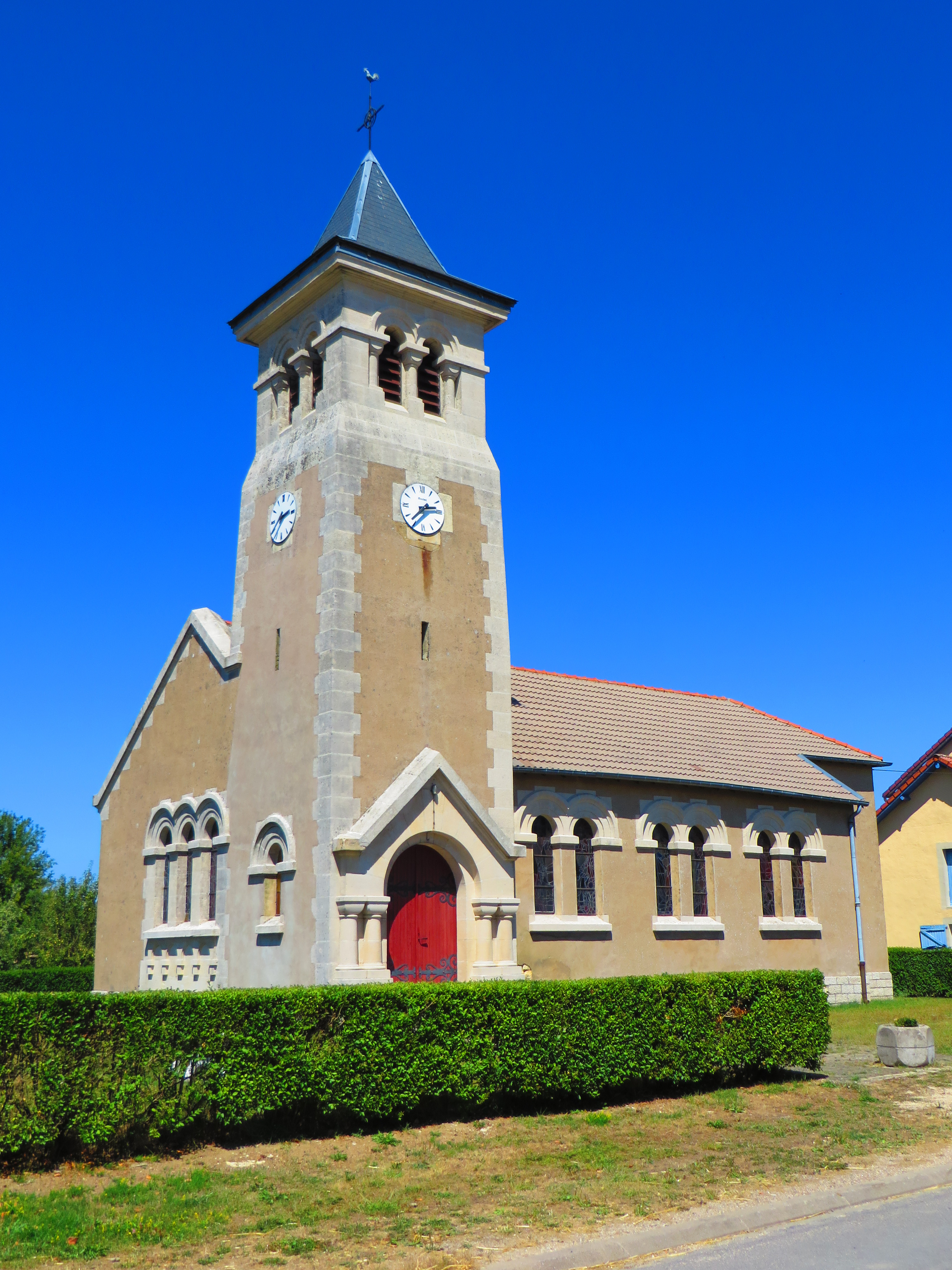
- The church in Damloup

- Coat of arms
- Location of Damloup
- Location within France Location within Grand Est
- Coordinates: 49°12′08″N 5°29′31″E
- Country: France
- Region: Grand Est
- Department: Meuse
- Arrondissement: Verdun
- Canton: Belleville-sur-Meuse
- Intercommunality: CC du pays d'Étain

Government
  - Mayor (2020–2026): Jean-Paul Colin
- Area^{1}: 5.28 km^{2} (2.04 sq mi)
- Elevation: 230 m (750 ft)
- Highest elevation: 357 m (1,171 ft)
- Lowest elevation: 220 m (720 ft)
- Population (2023): 129
  - Density: 24.4/km^{2} (63.3/sq mi)
- Time zone: UTC+01:00 (CET)
  - Summer (DST): UTC+02:00 (CEST)
- INSEE/Postal code: 55143 /55400
- ^{1} French Land Register data, which excludes lakes, ponds, glaciers > 1 km^{2} (0.386 sq mi or 247 acres) and river estuaries.

Damloup (French pronunciation: [dɑ̃lu]) is a commune in the Meuse department in Grand Est in north-eastern France. It is in the arrondissement of Verdun.

== World War I ==
Fort Vaux is partially within the boundaries of the commune (the other part is in the commune of Vaux-devant-Damloup). The Batterie de Damloup is located between Fort Vaux and the Laufée works (l'ouvrage D de la Laufée) which are both within the boundaries of the commune.

== See also ==
- Communes of the Meuse department
