= Fort Douaumont =

Historic fort outside Verdun, France, built in the late 19th century

Coordinates: 49°13′1″N 5°26′18″E

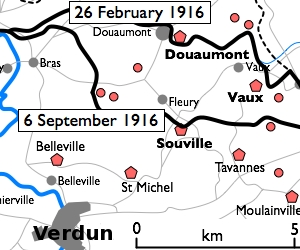
Forts around Verdun. Douaumont is north-east of Verdun at upper right. Limits of German advance as at 26 February and 6 September 1916 are black lines, the river Meuse, flowing to the north, is the blue line at left.

Fort Douaumont (French: Fort de Douaumont, pronounced [fɔʁ də dwomɔ̃]) was the largest and highest fort on the ring of 19 large defensive works which had protected the city of Verdun, France, since the 1890s. By 1915, the French General Staff had concluded that even the best-protected forts of Verdun could not withstand bombardments from the German 420 mm (16.5 in) Gamma guns. These new super-heavy howitzers had easily taken several large Belgian forts out of action in August 1914. Fort Douaumont and other Verdun forts were judged ineffective and had been partly disarmed and left virtually undefended since 1915. On 25 February 1916, Fort Douaumont was entered and occupied without a fight by a small German raiding party comprising only 19 officers and 79 men, entering via an open window by the moat. The easy fall of Fort Douaumont, only three days after the beginning of the Battle of Verdun, shocked the French Army. It set the stage for the rest of a battle which lasted nine months, at enormous human cost. Douaumont was finally recaptured by three infantry divisions of the Second Army, during the First Offensive Battle of Verdun on 24 October 1916. This event brought closure to the battle in 1916.

== History ==
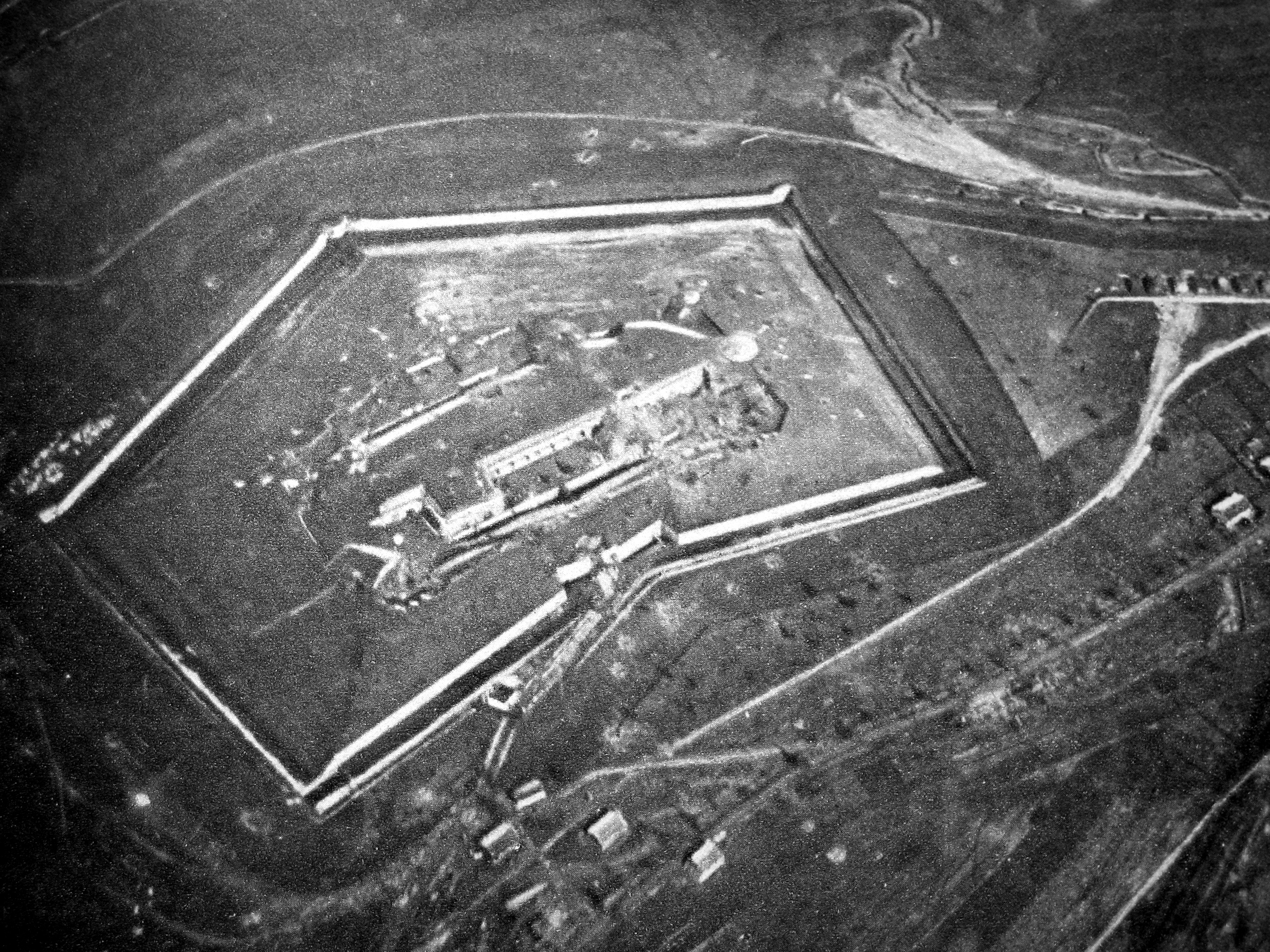
Aerial view early in 1916 before major destruction in the Battle of Verdun. North is approximately at top

Construction work started in 1885 near the village of Douaumont, on some of the highest ground in the area and the fort was continually reinforced until 1913. It has a total surface area of 30,000 m^{2} (36,000 sq yd) and is approximately 400 m (440 yd) long, with two subterranean levels protected by a steel reinforced concrete roof 12 m (13 yd) thick resting on a sand cushion. These improvements had been completed by 1903. The entrance to the fort was at the rear. Two main tunnels ran east–west, one above the other, with barrack rooms and corridors to outlying parts of the fort branched off of the main tunnels. The fort was equipped with numerous armed posts, a 155 mm rotating/retractable gun turret, a 75 mm gun rotating/retractable gun turret, four other 75 mm guns in flanking "Bourges Casemates" that swept the intervals and several machine-gun turrets. Entry into the moat around the fort was interdicted by Hotchkiss anti-personnel revolving cannons located in wall casemates or "Coffres" present at each corner.

With hindsight, Douaumont was much better prepared to withstand the heaviest bombardments than the Belgian forts that had been crushed by German 420 mm Gamma howitzers in 1914. The German invasion of Belgium in 1914 had forced military planners to radically rethink the utility of fortification in war. The Belgian forts had been quickly destroyed by German artillery and easily overrun. However, the Belgian forts were built with unreinforced concrete, with many layers that easily broke apart. In August 1915, General Joseph Joffre approved the reduction of the garrison at Douaumont and at other Verdun forts. Douaumont was stripped of all its weaponry except for the two turreted guns that were too difficult to remove: a 155 mm and a 75 mm gun. The two "Casemates de Bourges" bunkers, one on each side of the fort, were disarmed of their four 75s. The garrison was mostly middle-aged reservists, under the command of the city's military governor and not the field army.

=== Capture ===
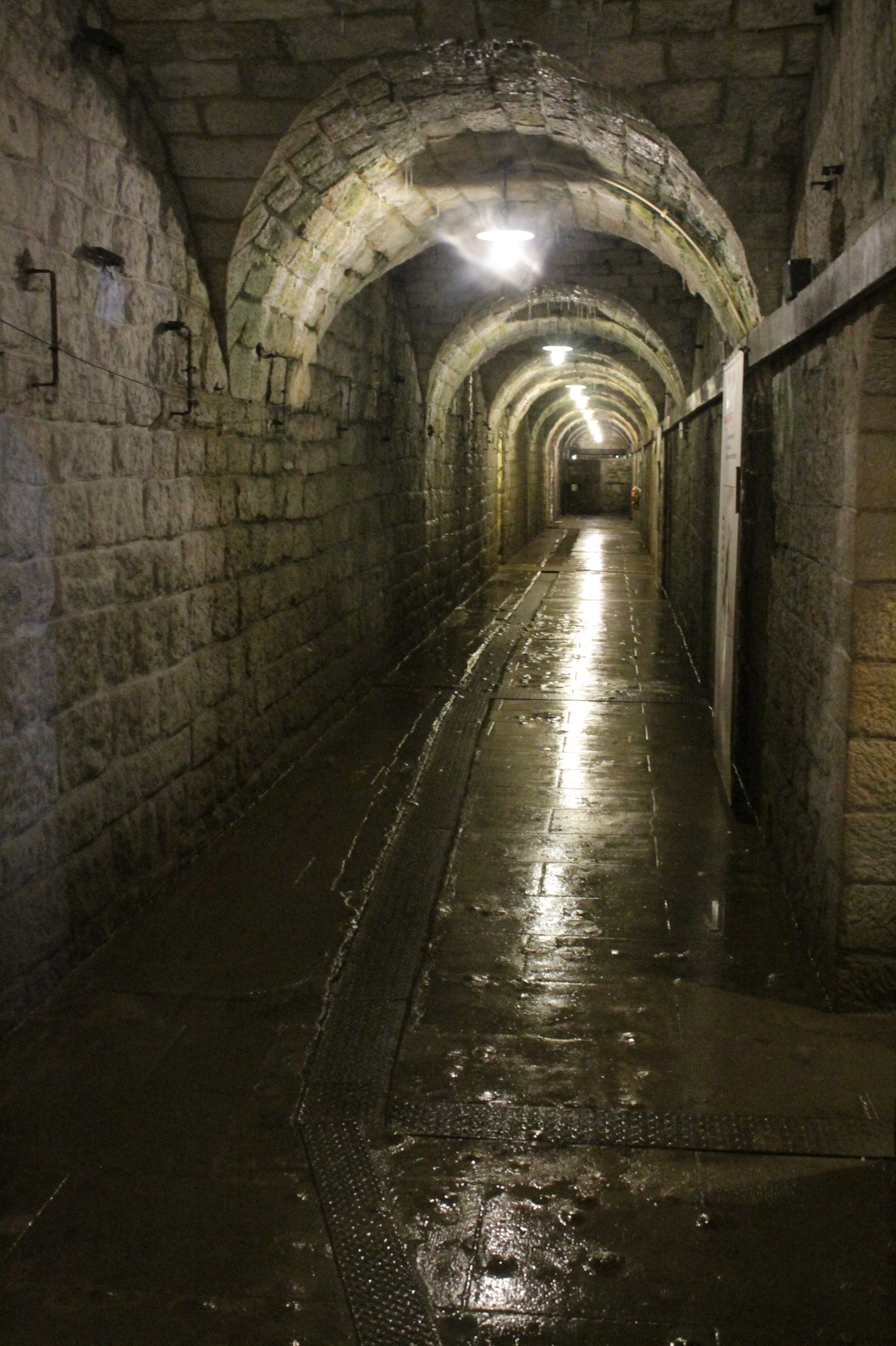
Main communication passage, Fort Douaumont

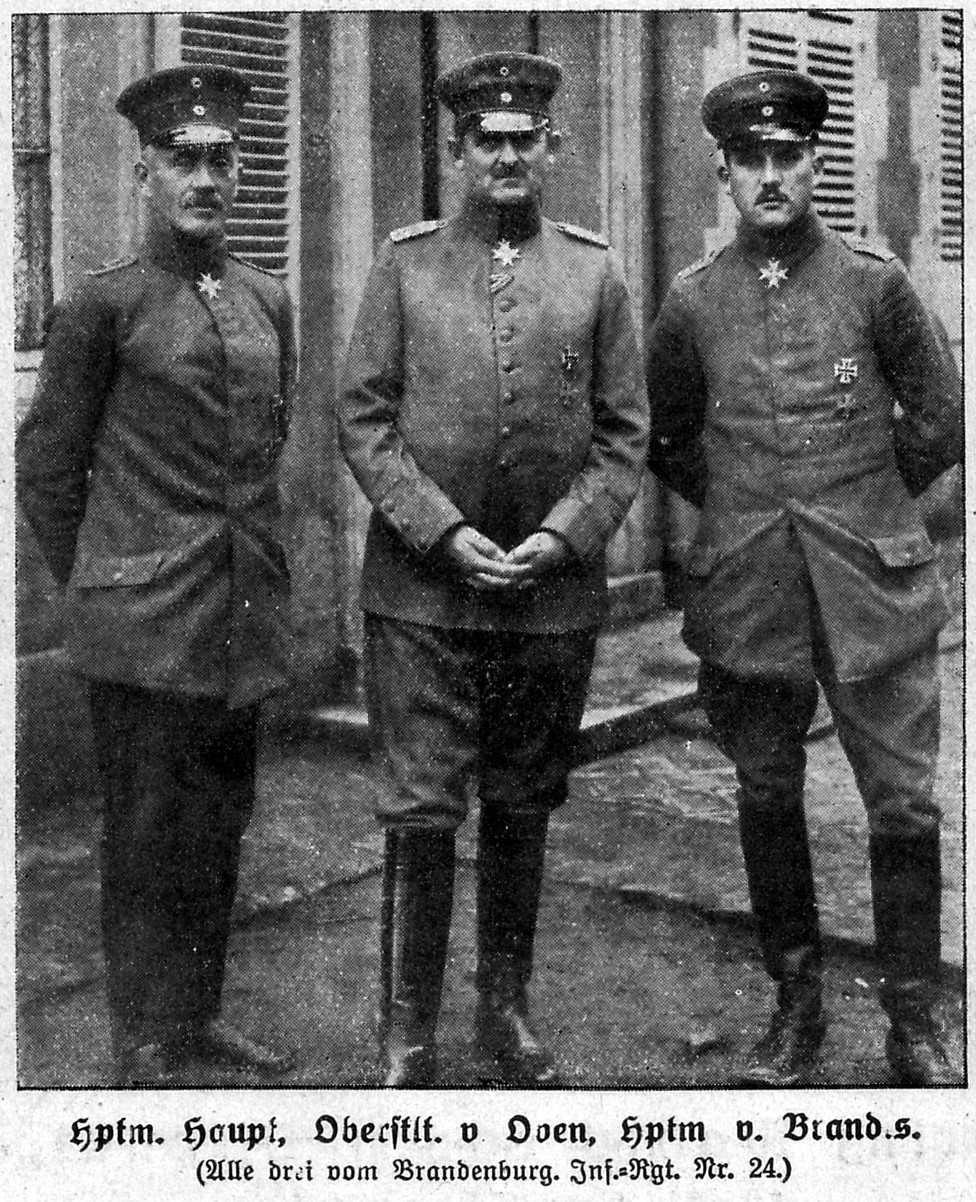
Captain Hans-Joachim Haupt, Lieutenant-Colonel von Oven, Captain Cordt von Brandis

On 21 February 1916, the German 5th Army began an offensive which started the Battle of Verdun. Douaumont was the largest and highest fort on the two concentric rings of forts protecting the city and thus the keystone to the city defenses. The German offensive was already four days old and progressing rapidly from the north when, on 24 February, it came within reach of Fort Douaumont. Fort Douaumont was still only manned by a maintenance crew of only 56 troops and a few gunners. The highest-ranked soldier in the fort was an NCO named Chenot. On 25 February, elements of the German 24th Brandenburg Regiment (6 Infanterie-Division, III Armeekorps) approached Fort Douaumont from the north, as a reconnaissance or raiding party. Most of the French garrison had already gone to the lower levels of the fort to escape the incessant German shelling with large-calibre guns. A battery of super-heavy 420 mm M-Gerät howitzers was intermittently pounding the fort, damaging the 75 mm gun turret.

The occupants had been without communication with the outside world for some time. The observation cupolas were unoccupied. Only a small gunnery team was manning the 155 mm gun turret, which was firing at distant targets. The dry moats which could have been swept by French machine-gun fire from the wall "casemates" or "coffres" had been left undefended. About 10 combat engineers from the Brandenburg regiment, led by Pioneer-Sergeant Kunze, managed to approach the fort unopposed. Visibility was poor due to bad weather, and French machine gunners in the village of Douaumont thought the Germans were French colonial troops returning from a patrol. Kunze and his men reached the moat and found that the wall casemates (coffres) defending the moat were unoccupied. Kunze managed to climb inside one of them to open a door. Kunze's men refused to go inside the fortification, fearing an ambush. Armed only with a rifle, the Pioneer-Sergeant entered alone. He wandered around the empty tunnels until he found the artillery team, captured them and locked them up.

By now, another group from the Brandenburg regiment, led by reserve-officer Lieutenant Radtke, was also entering the fort through its unoccupied defences. Radtke then made contact with Kunze's troops and organised them before they spread out, capturing a few more French defenders and securing the fort. Later, more columns of German troops under Hauptmann Haupt and Oberleutnant von Brandis arrived. No shots were ever fired in the capture of Fort Douaumont. The only casualty was one of Kunze's men, who scraped a knee. Despite being the last officer to enter the fort, von Brandis was the one who dispatched the report on the capture of Douaumont to the German High Command. A few days later, the Prussian officer was telling Crown Prince Wilhelm about its heroic seizure. No mention was made of the efforts of Lieutenant Radtke or Sergeant Kunze. Instead von Brandis became the "Hero of Douaumont" and was awarded the Pour le Mérite, (Haupt received it later, too). Kunze, who broke in and locked up the garrison and Radtke, who took command during the fort's capture, received no award. It was not until the 1930s, after historians from the German Great War committee had time to review the capture of Fort Douaumont that credit was belatedly given. Kunze, now a member of the Ordnungspolizei, received a promotion and the order of Pour le Mérite, while Lieutenant Radtke got an autographed portrait of former Crown Prince Wilhelm.

Douaumont, the keystone of the system of forts that was to protect Verdun against a German invasion, had been given up without a fight. In the words of one French divisional commander, its loss would cost the French army 100,000 lives. Douaumont's easy fall was a disaster for the French and a glaring example of the lack of judgment prevailing in the General Staff at the time, under General Joffre. The French General Staff had decided in August 1915 to partially disarm all the Verdun forts, acting under the erroneous assumption that the forts could not resist the effects of modern heavy artillery. After its capture, Douaumont became an invulnerable shelter and operational base for German forces just behind their front line. The German soldiers at Verdun came to refer to the place as "Old Uncle Douaumont".

=== Recapture ===
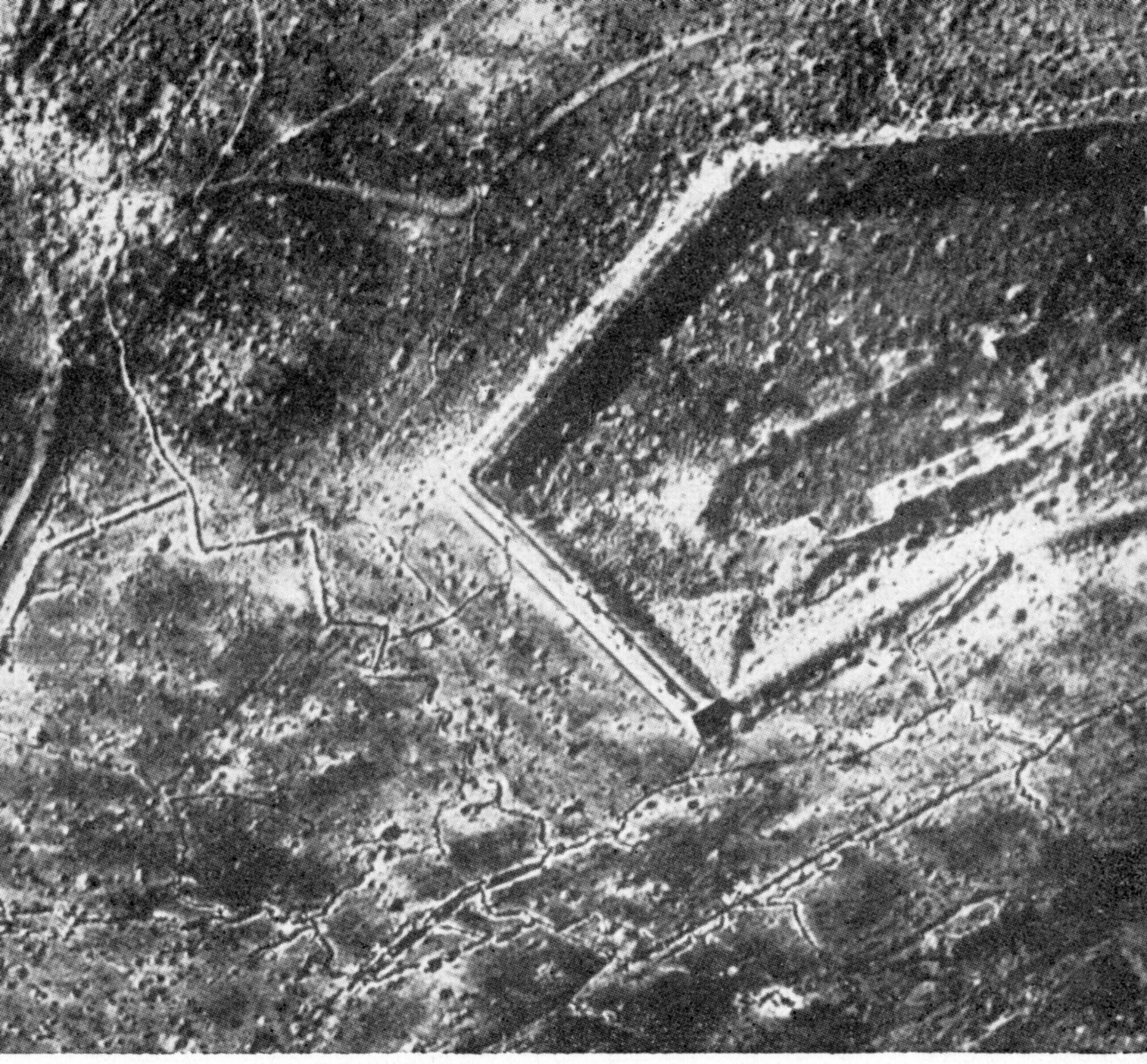
Aerial view towards the end of 1916, showing trenches and shell craters. North is approximately at top

The French Second Army made a first attempt to recapture the fort in late May 1916. They occupied the western end of the fort for 36 hours but were dislodged after suffering heavy losses, mostly from German artillery and trench mortars nearby. The Germans stubbornly held onto the fort, as it provided shelter for troops and served as first aid station and supply dump. French artillery continued to shell the fort, turning the area into a pockmarked moonscape, traces of which are still visible. On 8 May 1916, an unattended cooking fire had detonated grenades and flamethrower fuel, which detonated an ammunition cache. Apparently some of the soldiers tried to heat coffee using flamethrower fuel, which proved to be too flammable and spread to shells which were without caution placed right next to such environments. A firestorm ripped through the fort, killing hundreds of soldiers instantly, including the 12th Grenadiers regimental staff. Some of the 1,800 wounded and soot-blackened survivors attempting to escape from the inferno were mistaken for French colonial infantry and were fired upon by their comrades; 679 German soldiers perished in this fire. Their remains were gathered inside the fort at the time and placed into a casemate which was walled off. The site is underground, inside the fort and has long been an official German war grave. A commemorative plaque in German and a cross stand at the foot of the grave's sealing wall. The memorial is open to visitors.

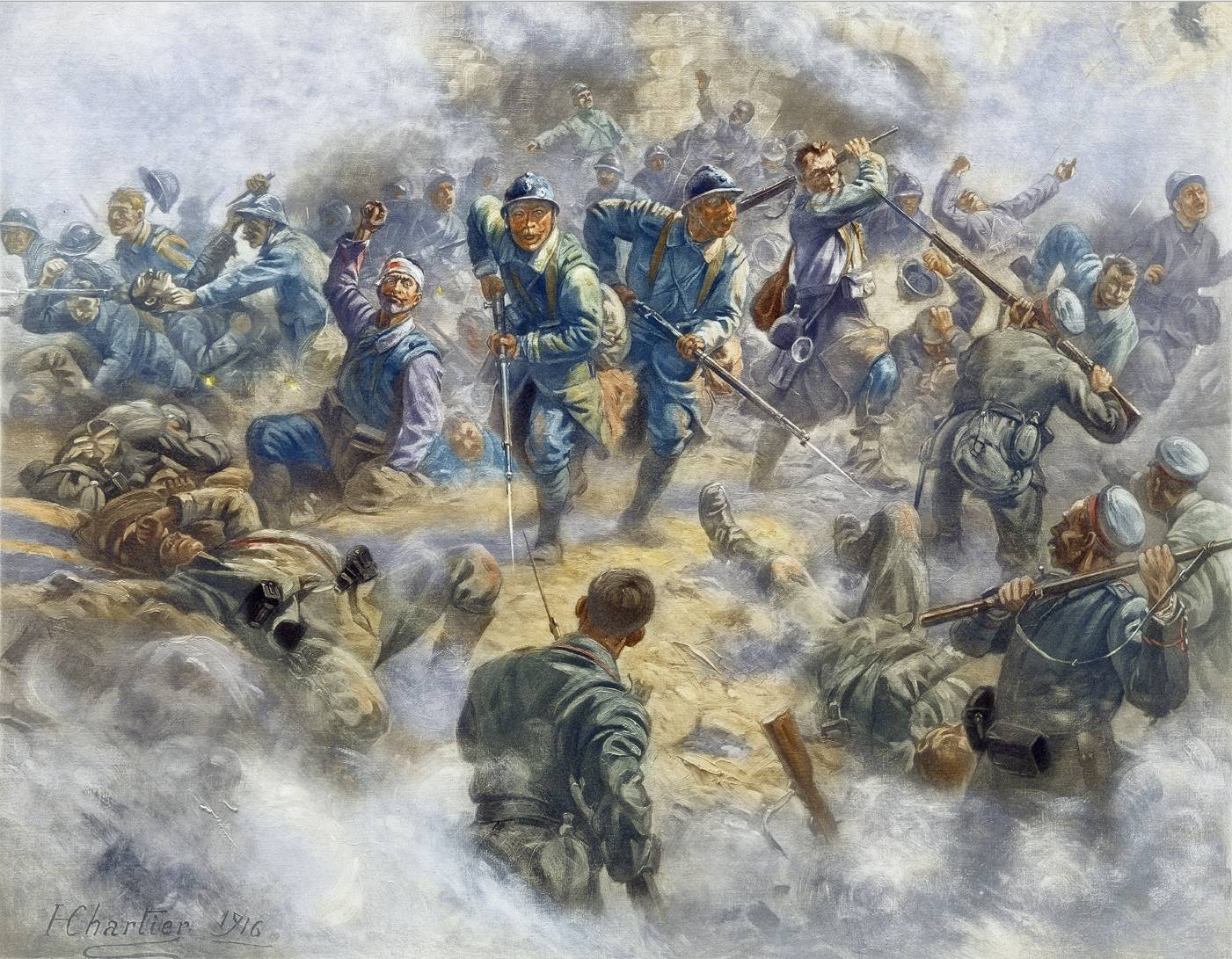
Recapture of Fort Douaumont on 24 October 1916.

A French offensive involving three infantry divisions began on 24 October 1916, to recapture the fort. This took place on the same day and was carried out by the elite Régiment d'infanterie-chars de marine (at that time designated the Régiment d'infanterie coloniale du Maroc, R.I.C.M (Regiment of Colonial Infantry of Morocco)). Douaumont had been pounded for days by two super heavy 400 mm (16 in) long-range French railway guns named "Alsace" and "Lorraine", emplaced at Baleycourt, 8.1 miles (13km) south-west of Verdun. Douaumont had become untenable under their fire and was in the process of being evacuated when it was recaptured. Millions of smaller shells had been fired at the fort since its capture by the Germans to little avail and tens of thousands of men had died in attempts to recapture it.

== Gallery ==
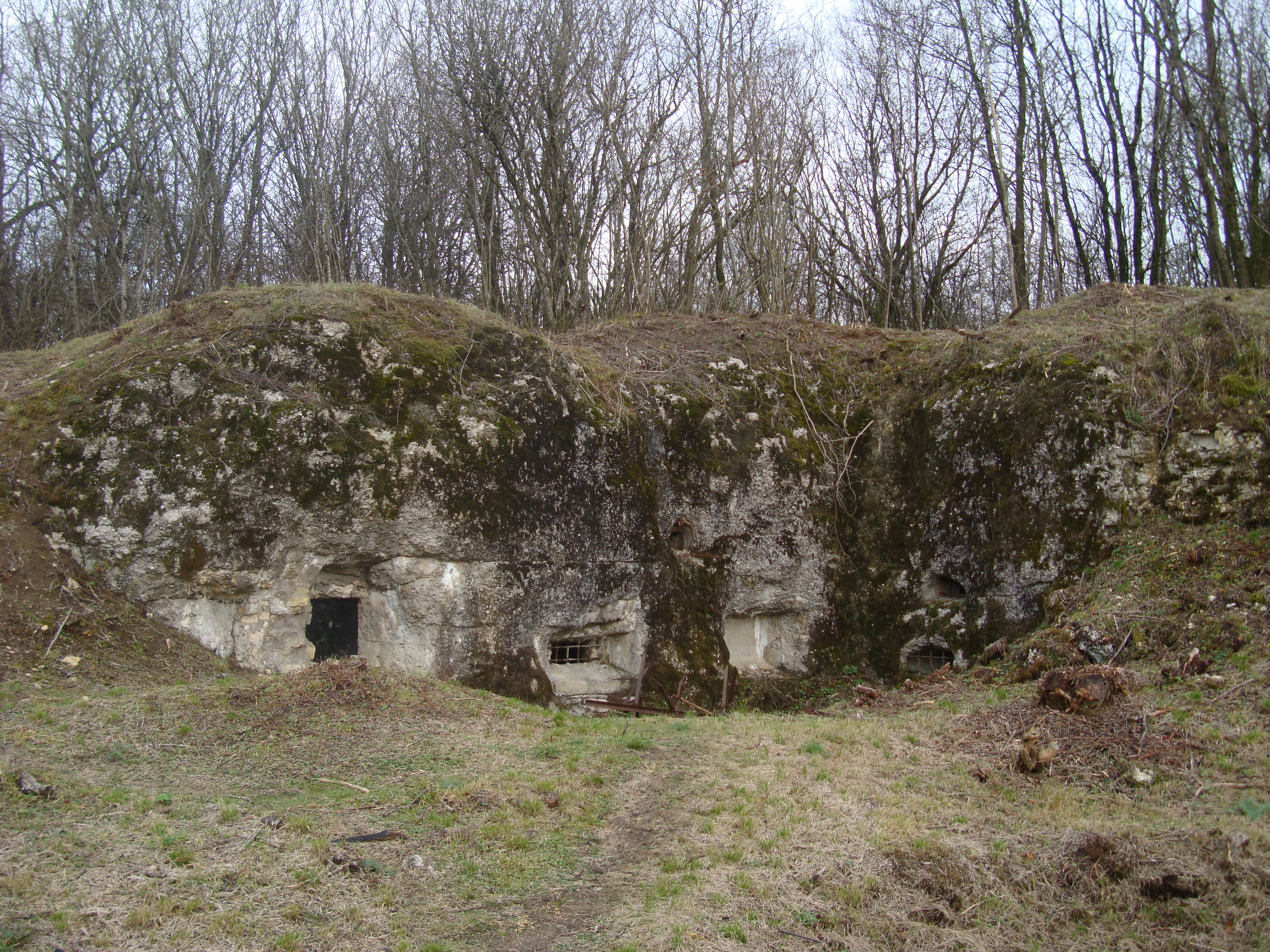
Defenses at the fort

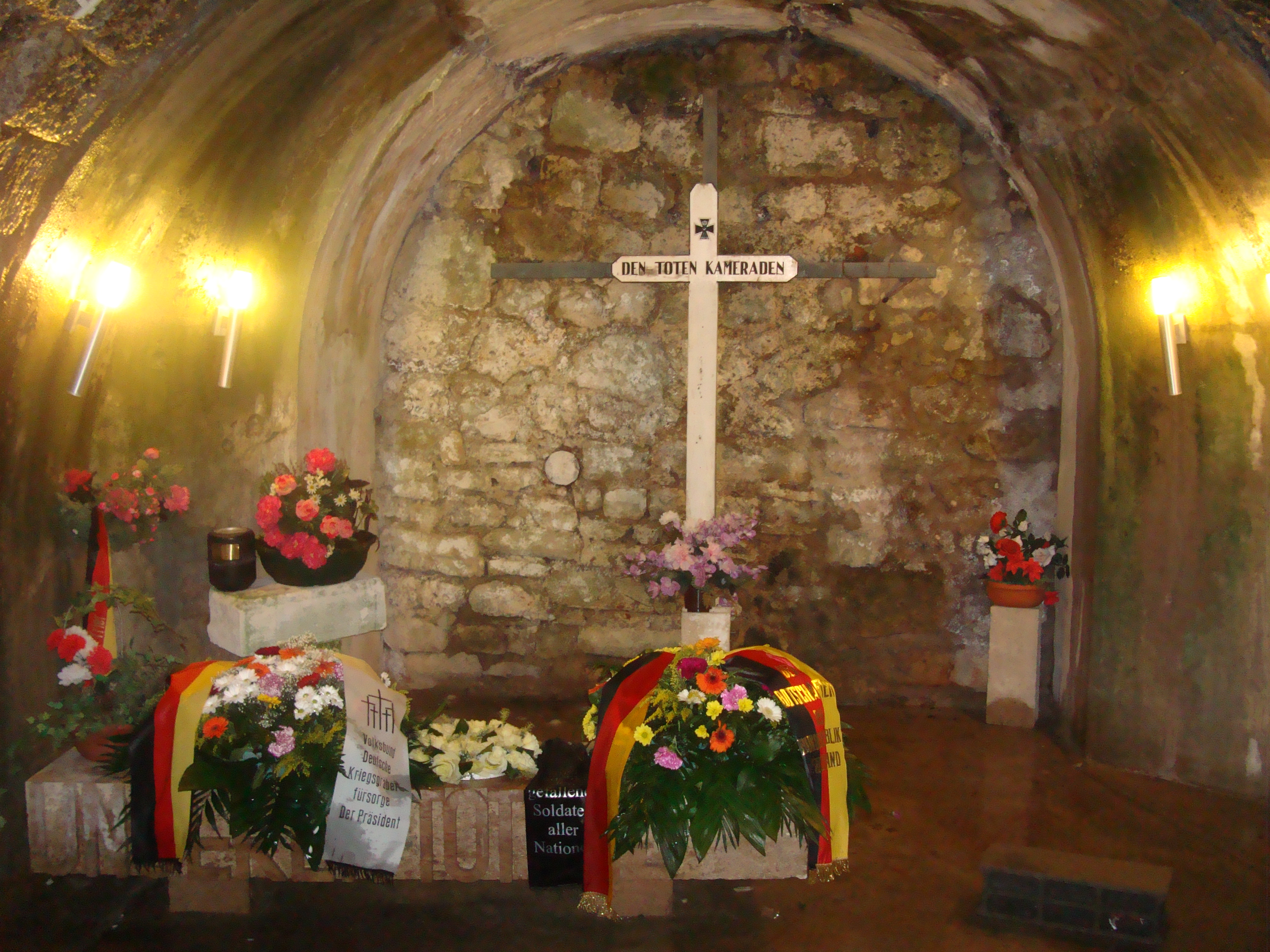
Memorial inside of the fort for German soldiers buried behind this wall.

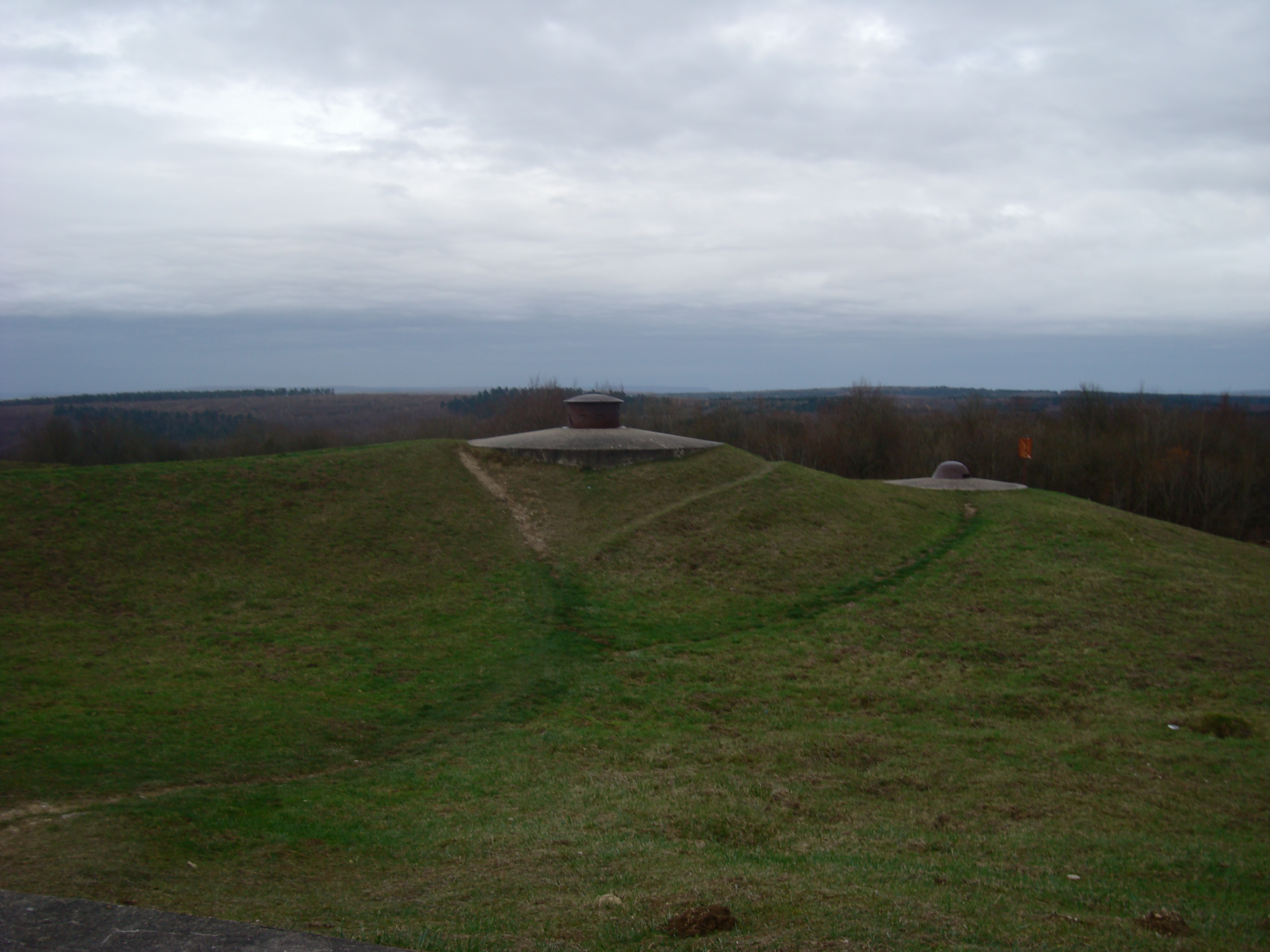
Defenses at the fort

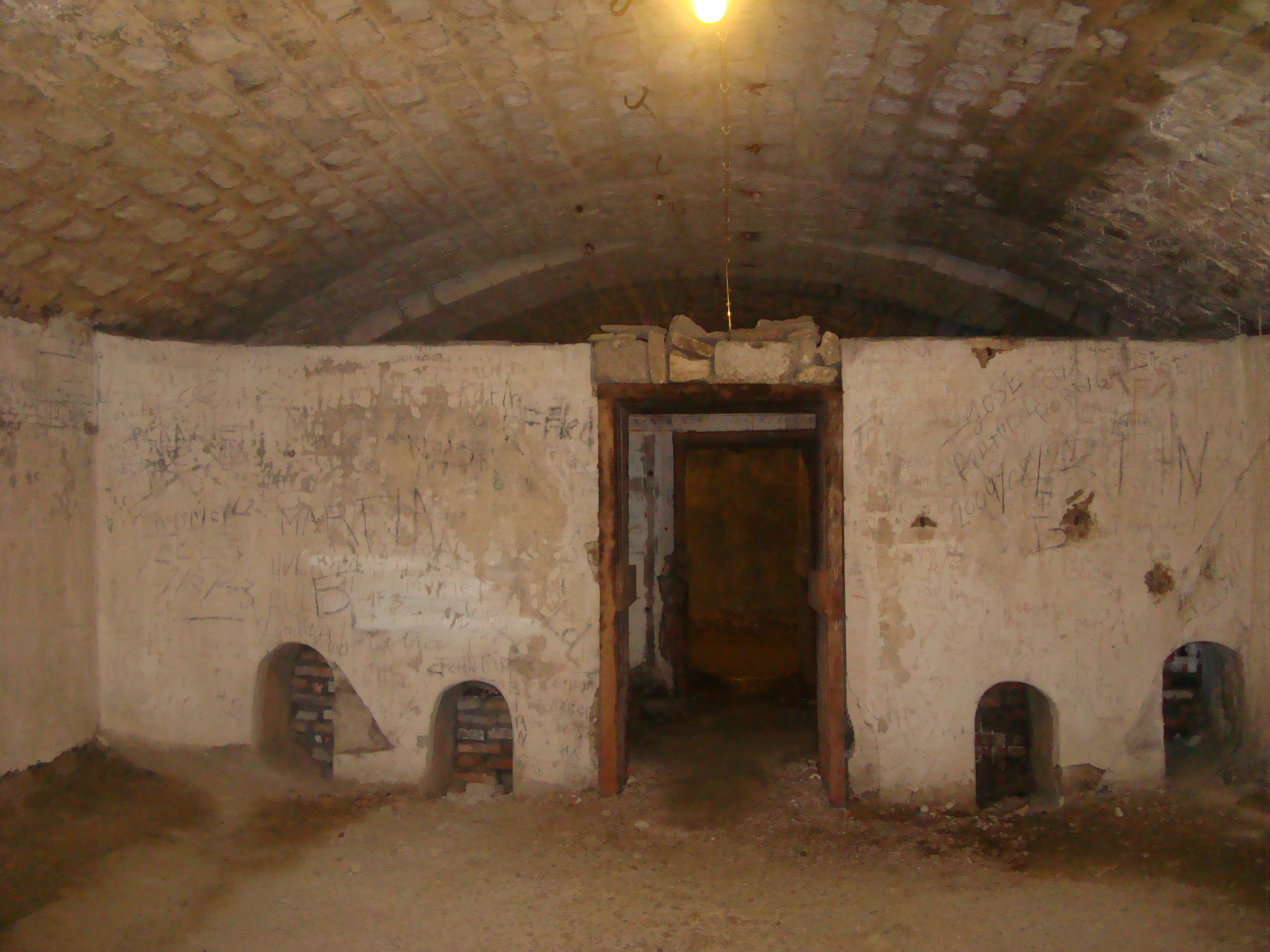
A room inside the fort

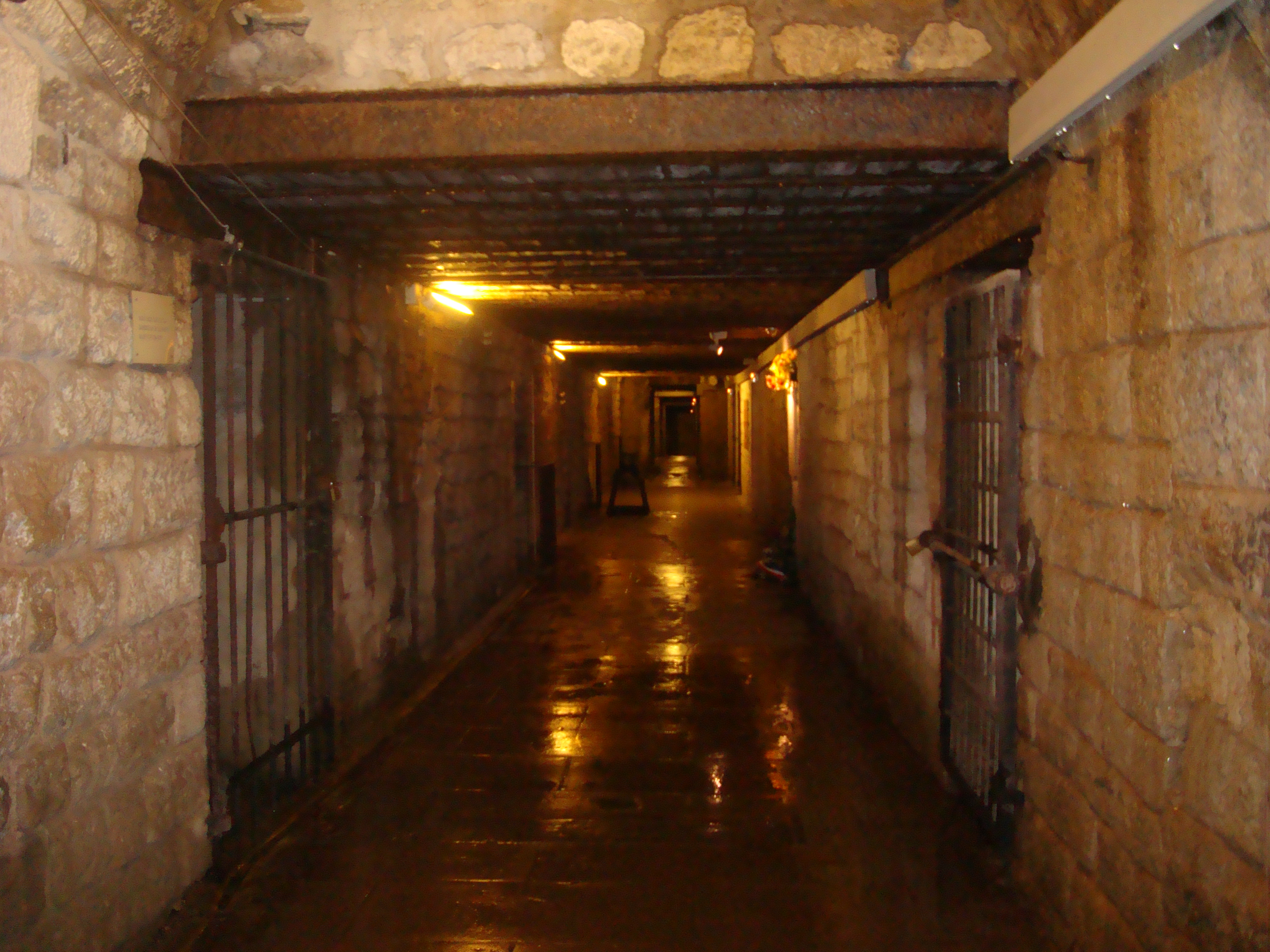
One of the hallways inside the fort

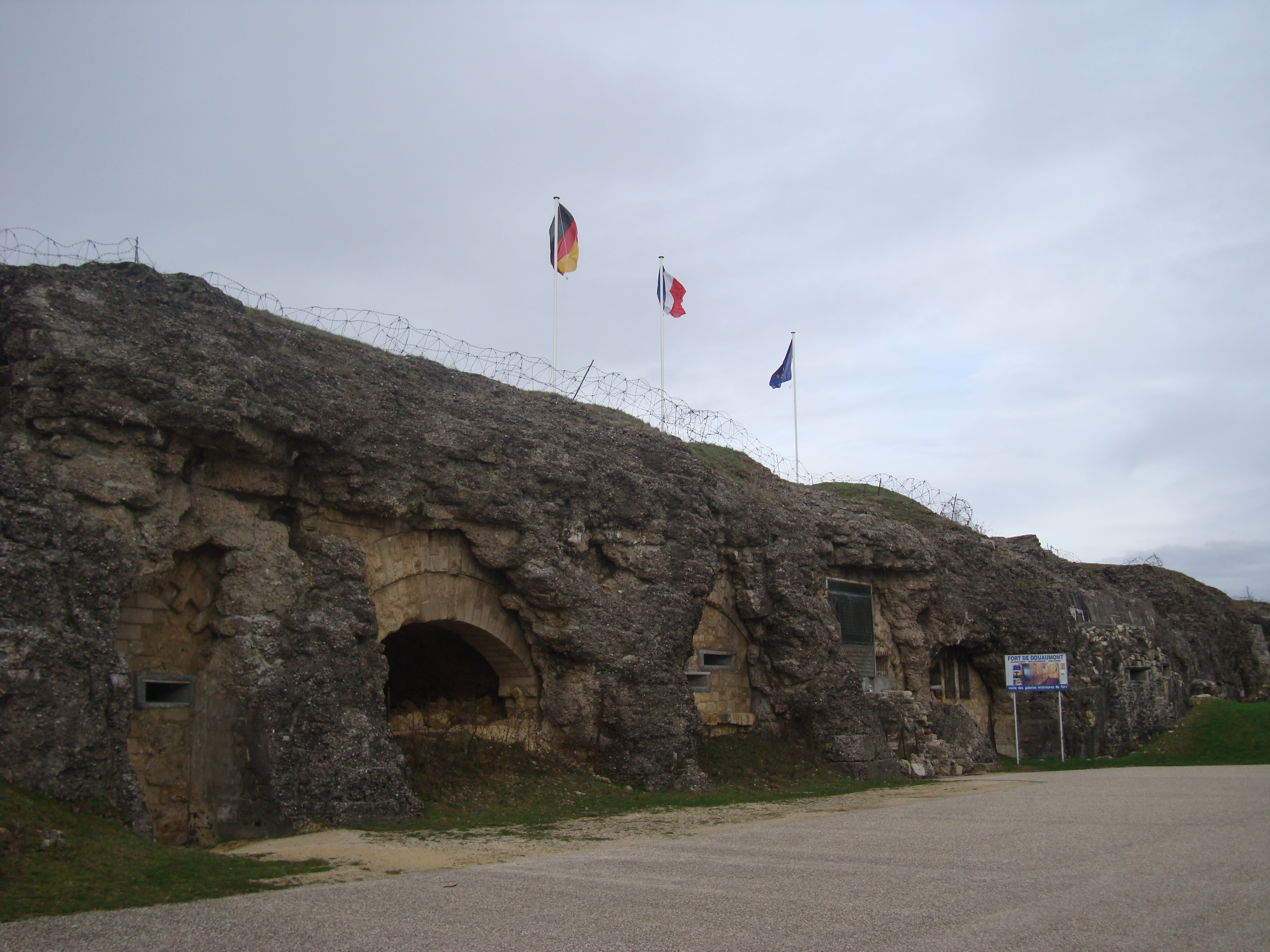
The entrance to the fort

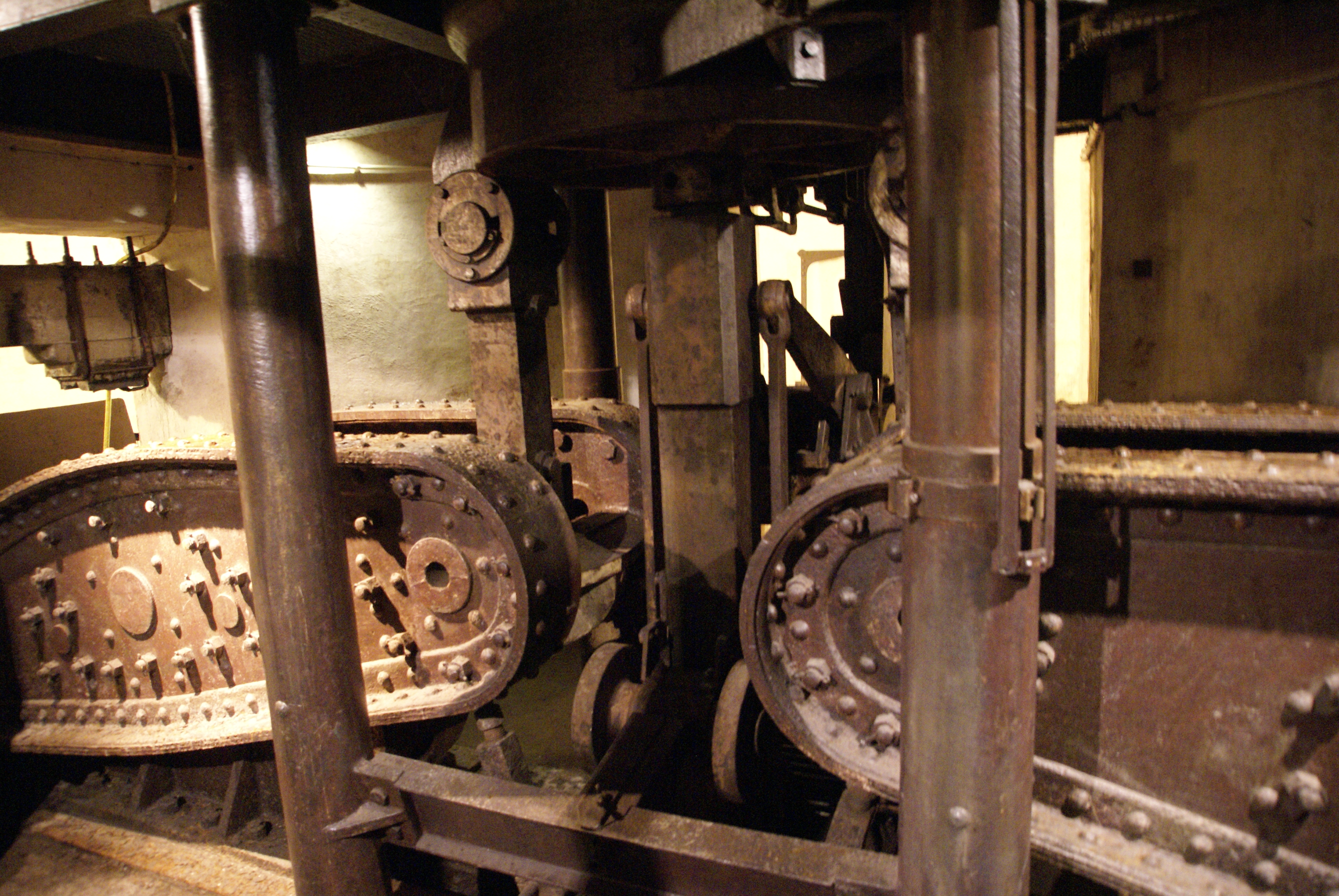
Elevating mechanism of 155mm gun turret

== See also ==
- Fort Vaux
- Zone rouge
- List of French villages destroyed in World War I
- Douaumont
- Douaumont Ossuary
- Battle of Verdun
