= Vaillant =

Vaillant may refer to:

- Vaillant (surname)
- Vaillant (automobile)
- Vaillant, Haute-Marne, a commune of the Haute-Marne department, France
- Vaillant (magazine) and Vaillant, le journal de Pif, children's magazines
- Vaillant Group, a group of companies operating in the HVAC and Renewable Energy sectors
- a ship sunk by an iceberg in 1897 with the loss of 78 lives
- Le Vaillant, a French pigeon appointed to the Legion of Honour in 1916

== See also ==
- Vaillante, a fictional automobile company in the French comic strip Michel Vaillant
