= Douaumont Ossuary =

Ossuary in Meuse, France

Douaumont Ossuary & Fleury-devant-Douaumont National Necropolis
- Ossuaire de Douaumont et Nécropole nationale de Fleury-devant-Douaumont
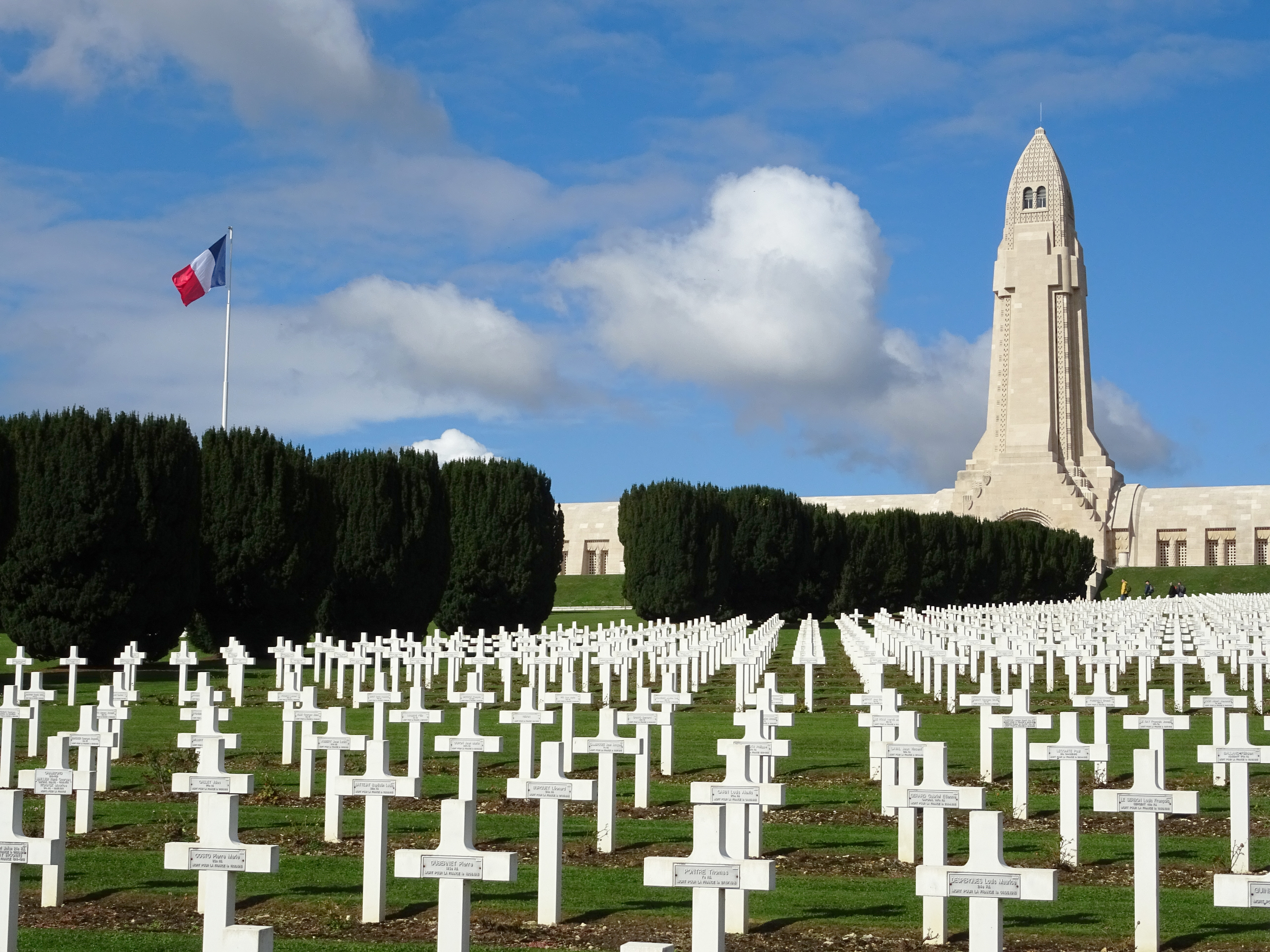
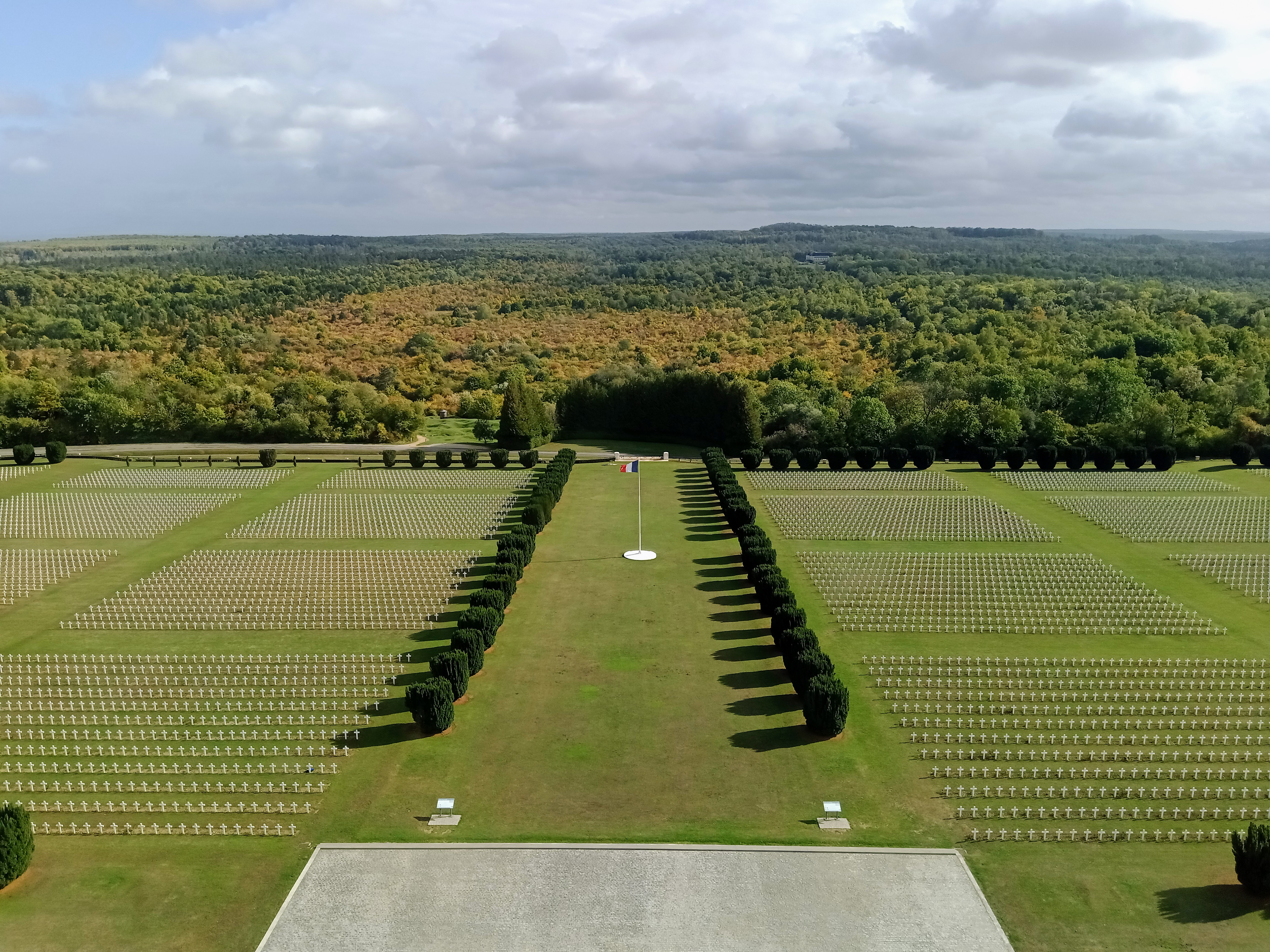
- Interactive map of Douaumont Ossuary & Fleury-devant-Douaumont; National Necropolis

Details
- Established: 7 August 1932 (inaugurated)
- Location: Douaumont-Vaux, Fleury-devant-Douaumont
- Country: France
- Coordinates: 49°12′27″N 05°25′27″E
- Type: Ossuary & Necropolis
- Owned by: Douaumont Ossuary Foundation; National Office for Veterans and Victims of War
- Size: 14.438 ha
- No. of graves: ~130,000 (Ossuary); ~16,000 (Necropolis)
- Website: Ossuary; Necropolis

UNESCO World Heritage Site
- Official name: Funerary and memory sites of the First World War (Western Front)
- Type: Cultural
- Criteria: i, ii, vi
- Designated: 2023 (45th session)
- Reference no.: 1567-ME05

The Douaumont Ossuary (French: Ossuaire de Douaumont) is a memorial containing the skeletal remains of soldiers who died on the battlefield during the Battle of Verdun in World War I. It is located in Douaumont-Vaux, France, within the Verdun battlefield, and immediately next to the Fleury-devant-Douaumont National Necropolis. It was built on the initiative of Charles Ginisty, Bishop of Verdun.

== History ==
During the 300 days of the Battle of Verdun (21 February 1916 – 19 December 1916) approximately 300,000 men died out of a total of 700,000 casualties (dead, wounded and missing). The battle became known in German as Die Hölle von Verdun (English: The Hell of Verdun), or in French as L'Enfer de Verdun, and was conducted on a battlefield covering less than 20 square kilometers (7.7 sq mi).

== Ossuary information ==
The ossuary is a memorial containing the remains of both French and German soldiers who died on the Verdun battlefield. Through small outside windows, the skeletal remains of at least 130,000 unidentified combatants of both nations can be seen filling up alcoves at the lower edge of the building. On the inside of the ossuary building, the ceiling and walls are partly covered by plaques bearing names of French soldiers who died during the Battle of Verdun. A few of the names are from fighting that took place in the area during World War II, as well as for veterans of the Indochina and Algerian Wars. The families of the soldiers that are recognized here by name contributed for those individual plaques. In front of the monument, and sloping downhill, lies the largest single French military cemetery of the First World War with 16,142 graves. It was inaugurated in 1923 by Verdun veteran André Maginot, who would later approve work on the Maginot Line.

The ossuary was officially inaugurated on 7 August 1932 by French President Albert Lebrun.

== Architecture ==
The architects of the ossuary were Léon Azéma, Max Edrei, and Jacques Hardy. George Desvallières designed the stained glass windows. The tower is 46 meters (151 ft) high and has a panoramic view of the battlefields. The tower contains a bronze death-bell, weighing over 2 tonnes (2.0 long tons; 2.2 short tons), called Bourdon de la Victoire, which is sounded at official ceremonies. It was offered by an American benefactor, Anne Thornburn Van Buren, in 1927. At the top of the tower is a rotating red and white "lantern of the dead", which shines on the battlefields at night. The cloister is 137 meters (449 ft) long and contains 42 interior alcoves.

== See also ==
- Fort Douaumont
- Battle of the Somme
- Thiepval Memorial to the Missing of the Somme
- World War I memorials
