= Douaumont =

Commune in Meuse, France

- Part of Douaumont-Vaux
- Coat of arms
- Location of Douaumont
- Location within France Location within Grand Est
- Coordinates: 49°13′15″N 5°25′56″E
- Country: France
- Region: Grand Est
- Department: Meuse
- Arrondissement: Verdun
- Canton: Belleville-sur-Meuse
- Commune: Douaumont-Vaux
- Area^{1}: 6.14 km^{2} (2.37 sq mi)
- Elevation: 380 m (1,250 ft)
- Highest elevation: 395 m (1,296 ft)
- Lowest elevation: 240 m (790 ft)
- Population (2022): 4
  - Density: 0.65/km^{2} (1.7/sq mi)
- Time zone: UTC+01:00 (CET)
  - Summer (DST): UTC+02:00 (CEST)
- Postal code: 55100
- ^{1} French Land Register data, which excludes lakes, ponds, glaciers > 1 km^{2} (0.386 sq mi or 247 acres) and river estuaries.

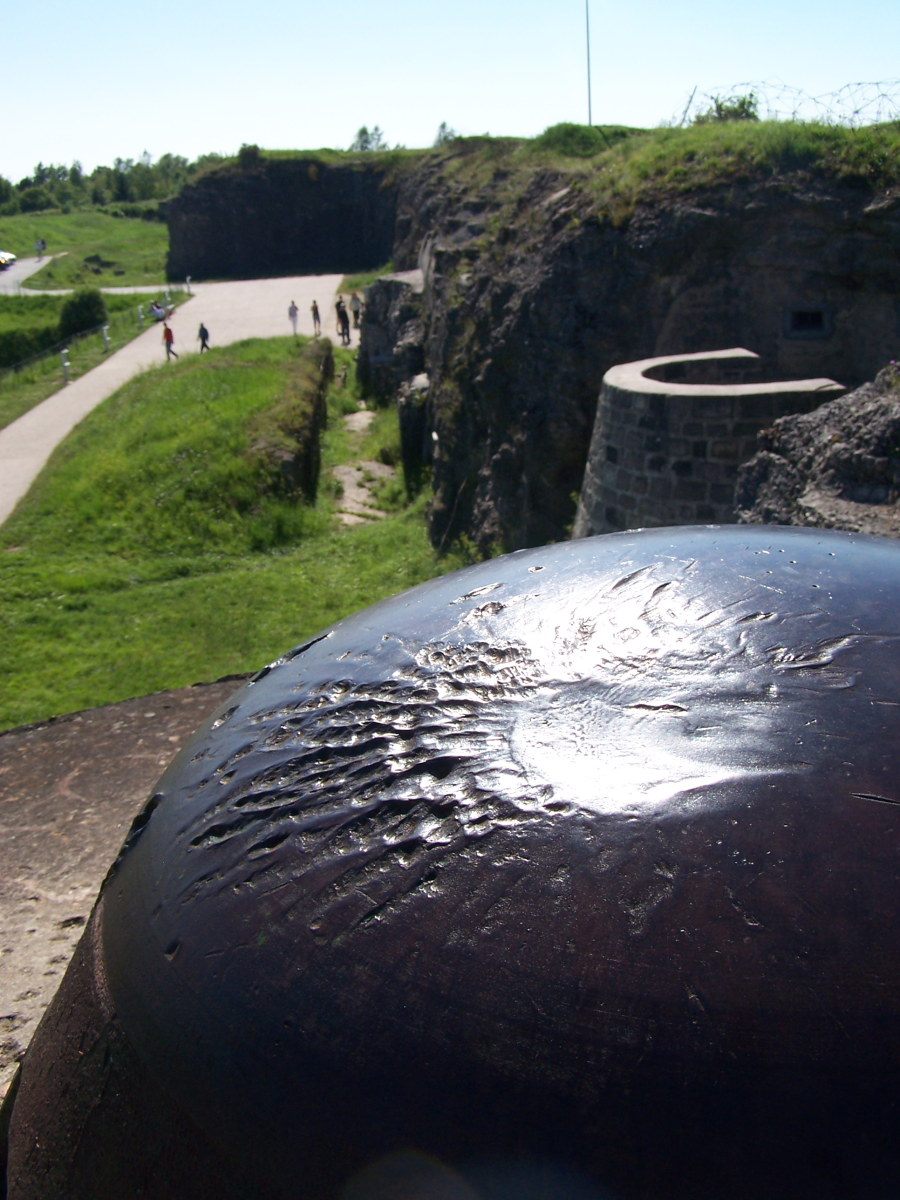
Douaumont tourelle

Douaumont (French pronunciation: [dwomɔ̃]) is a former commune in the Meuse department in Grand Est in north-eastern France. On 1 January 2019, it was merged into the new commune Douaumont-Vaux.

== History ==
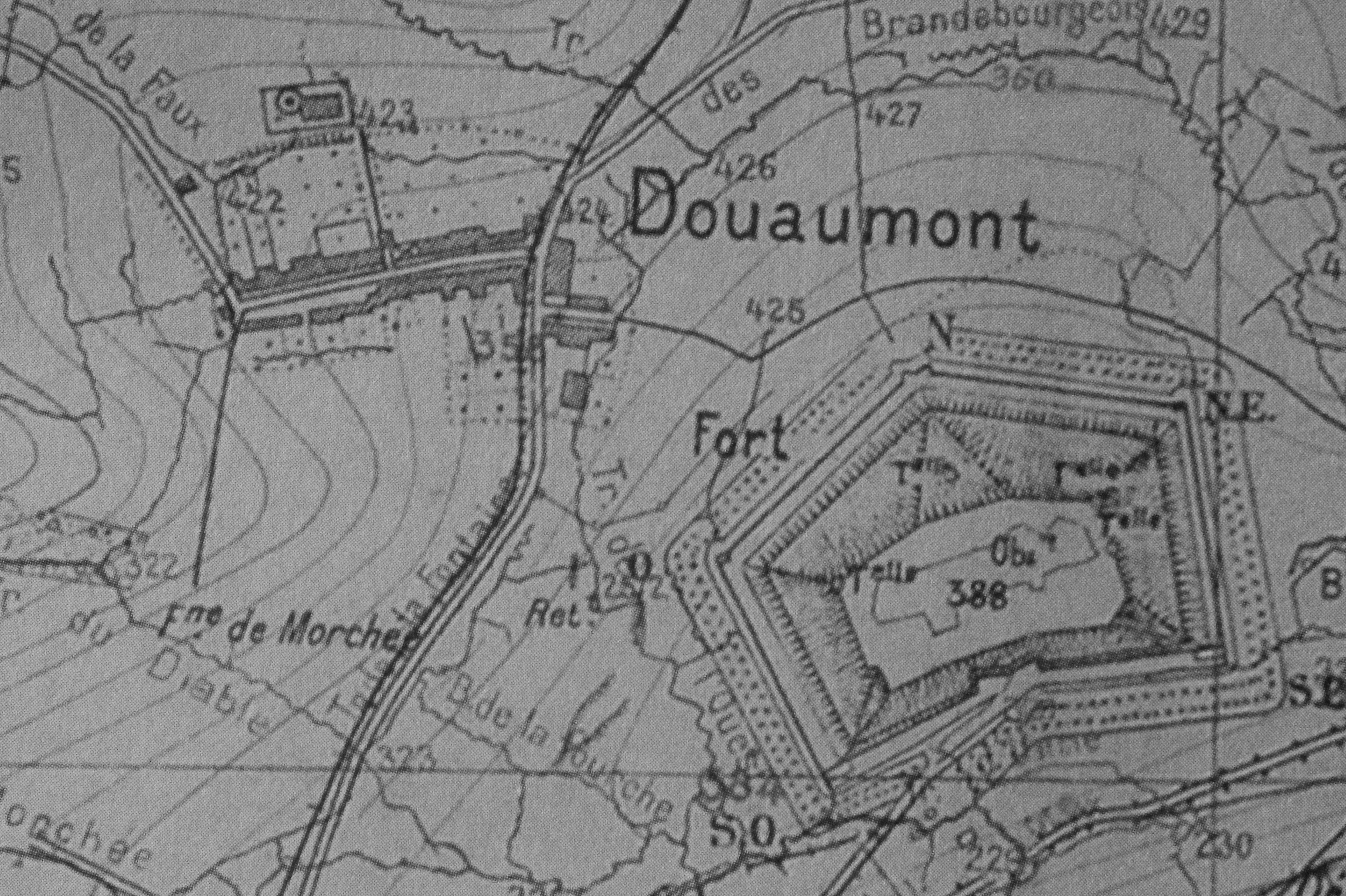
Map showing Douaumont and Fort Douaumont

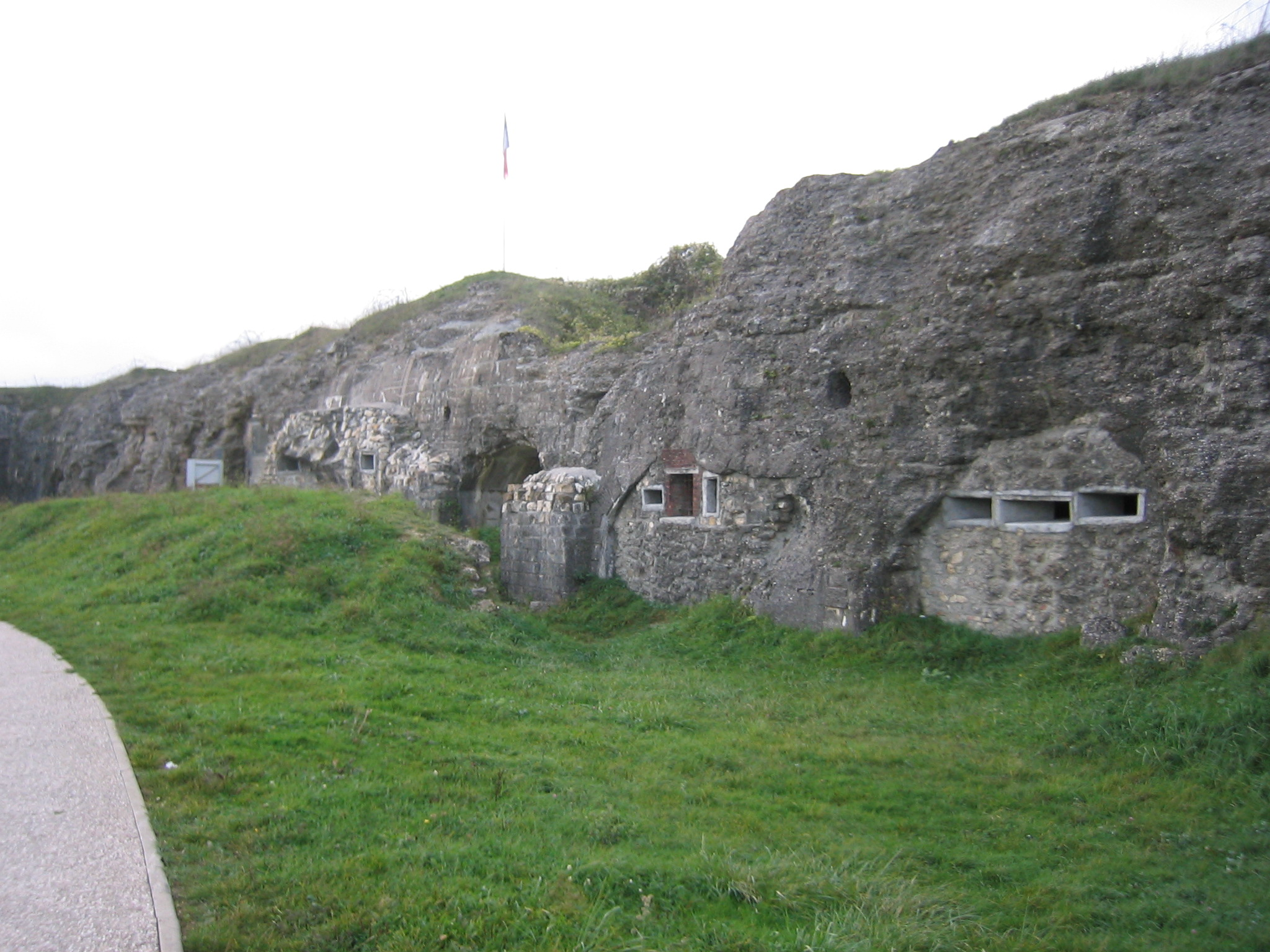
Douaumont Fort – General view

The village was a single street lying on an east-west axis and appears to have been connected to a local industry. The population was 288 in 1911.

The village was totally destroyed during World War I. Today the Douaumont Ossuary, which contains the remains of more than 100,000 unknown soldiers of both French and German nationalities found on the battlefield, stands high above the landscape.

== Douaumont Fort ==
The fort was built south-east of the village.

The construction work for Fort de Douaumont started in 1885 and the fort was continually reinforced until 1913. The fort is situated on some of the highest ground in the area. At the very beginning of the Battle of Verdun (February 1916) and due to French unpreparedness, the fort was easily captured by a small German raiding party. Douaumont was later recaptured by the French Army in October 1916, after major casualties on both sides.

== See also ==
- Douaumont Ossuary
- Zone rouge (First World War)
- List of French villages destroyed in World War I
- Communes of the Meuse department
- La Grande Illusion (film, Jean Renoir, 1937)
