= Vaux-devant-Damloup =

- Part of Douaumont-Vaux
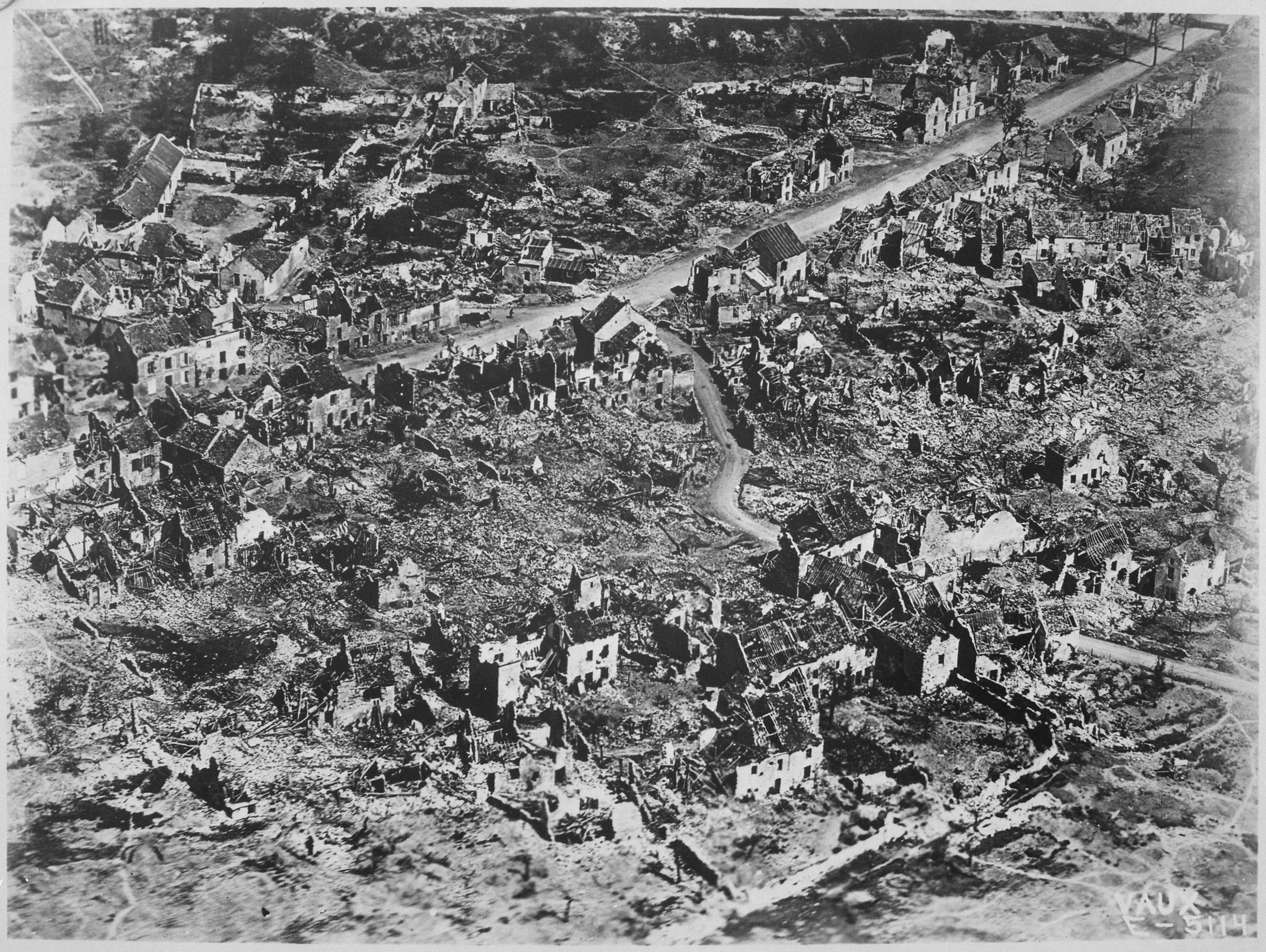
- Ruins of Vaux, 1918

- Coat of arms
- Location of Vaux-devant-Damloup
- Location within France Location within Grand Est
- Coordinates: 49°12′44″N 5°28′24″E
- Country: France
- Region: Grand Est
- Department: Meuse
- Arrondissement: Verdun
- Canton: Belleville-sur-Meuse
- Commune: Douaumont-Vaux
- Area^{1}: 6.56 km^{2} (2.53 sq mi)
- Elevation: 270 m (890 ft)
- Highest elevation: 361 m (1,184 ft)
- Lowest elevation: 244 m (801 ft)
- Population (2022): 77
  - Density: 12/km^{2} (30/sq mi)
- Time zone: UTC+01:00 (CET)
  - Summer (DST): UTC+02:00 (CEST)
- Postal code: 55400
- ^{1} French Land Register data, which excludes lakes, ponds, glaciers > 1 km^{2} (0.386 sq mi or 247 acres) and river estuaries.

Vaux-devant-Damloup (French pronunciation: [vo d(ə)vɑ̃ dɑ̃lu], literally Vaux before Damloup) is a former commune in the Meuse department in Grand Est in north-eastern France. It had a population of 77 (2022). On 1 January 2019, it was merged into the new commune Douaumont-Vaux.

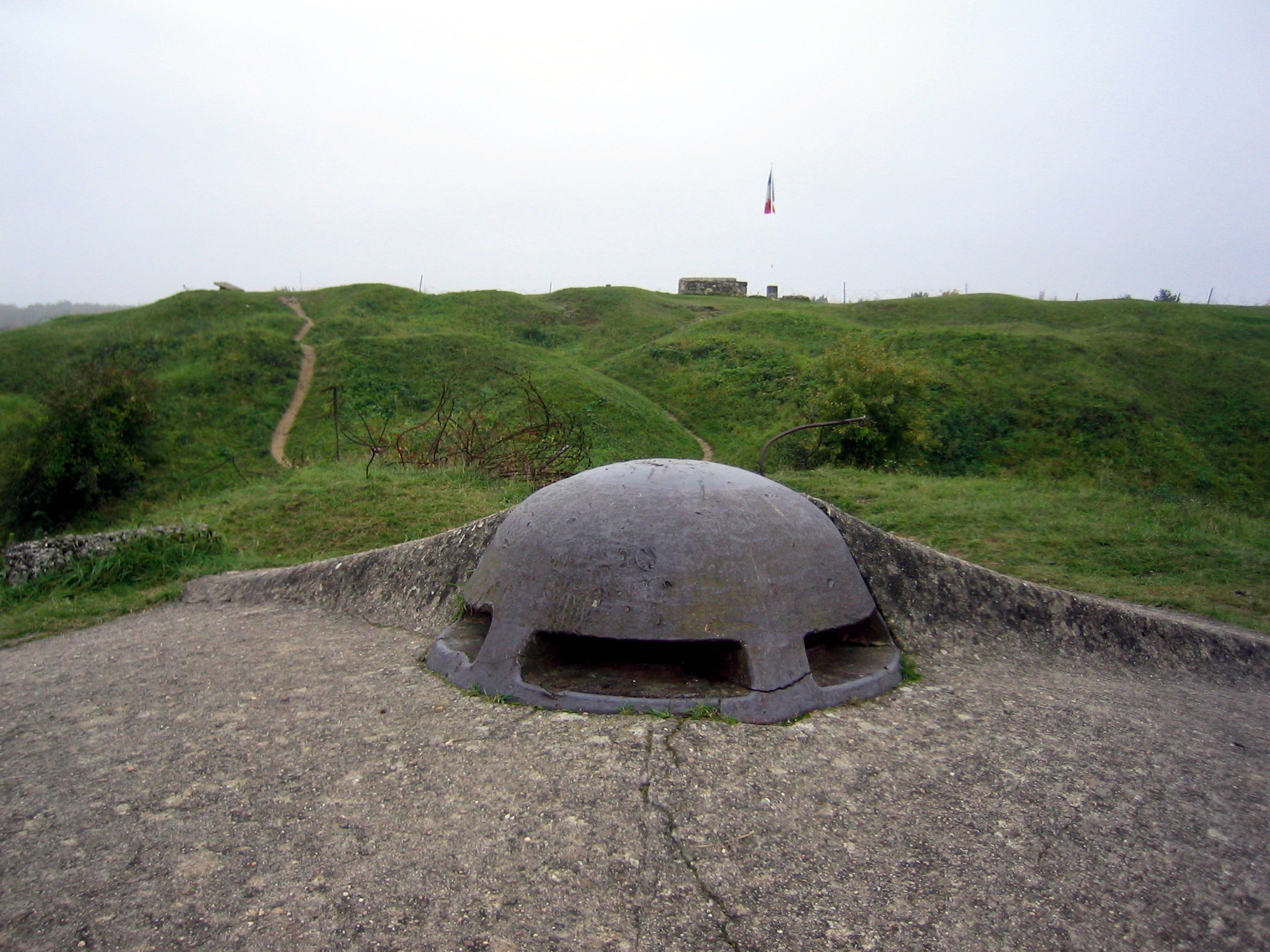
Cupola at Fort Vaux

Fort Vaux is partially located within the territory of the commune (the other part is in Damloup).

It was one of the French villages destroyed during World War I. The new village was rebuilt near the old village, which is now a memorial.

== See also ==
- Zone rouge (First World War)
- Communes of the Meuse department
