= Kurt Rackow =

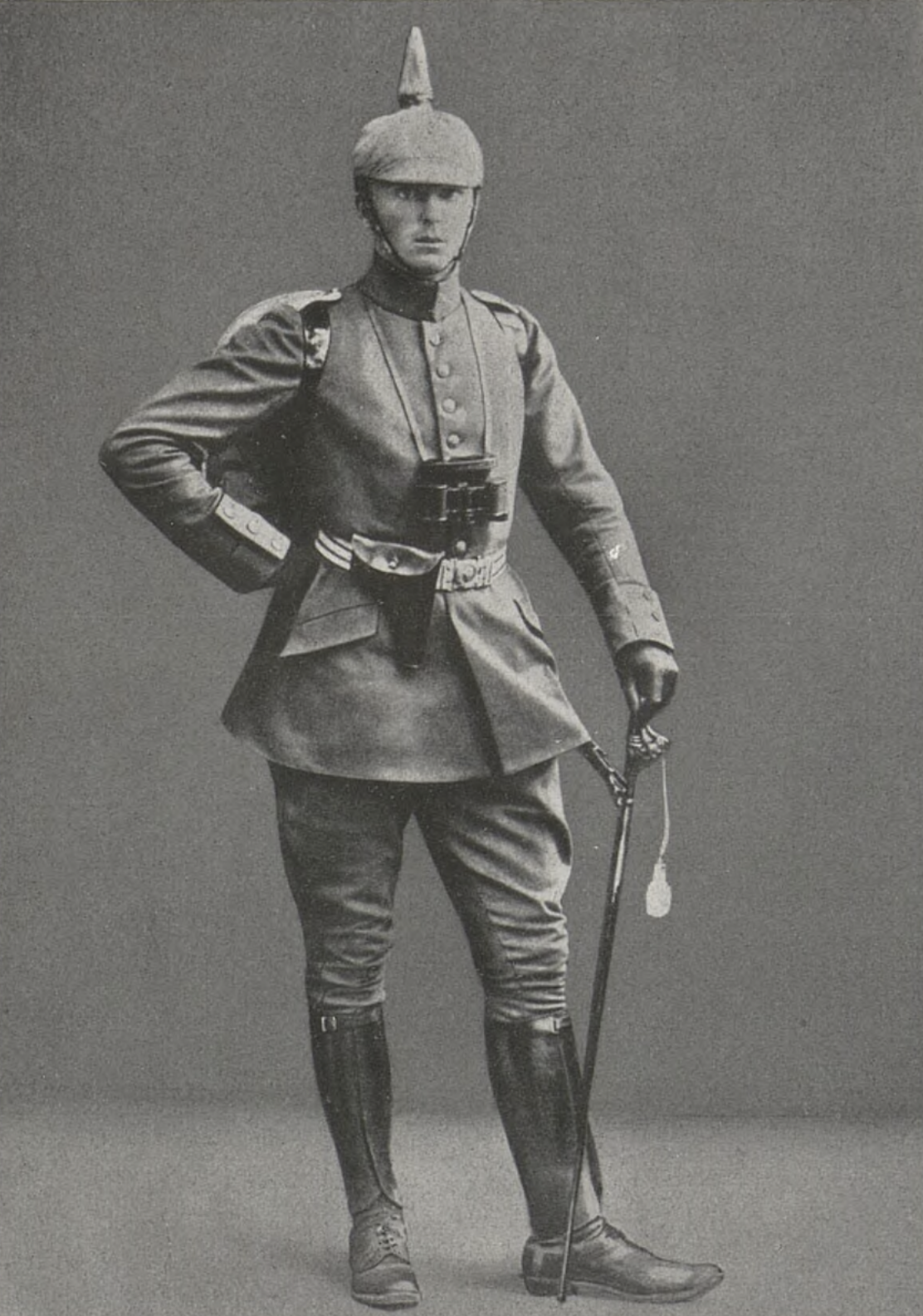
- Kurt Rackow, c. 1916
- Born: 20 August 1893
- Died: 6 October 1923 (aged 30)
- Military career
- Allegiance: German Empire; Weimar Republic
- Branch: Imperial German Army; Reichswehr
- Service years: 1912–1920
- Rank: Oberleutnant (senior lieutenant)
- Units: 158th Paderborn Infantry Regiment, Freikorps Gabcke, 54th Infantry Regiment
- Conflicts: World War I (WIA); German Revolution of 1918–19
- Awards: Pour le Mérite

Kurt Rackow (20 August 1893 – 6 October 1923) was a German military officer and Pour le Mérite recipient who served in the Imperial German Army, Freikorps, and Reichswehr during World War I and the German Revolution of 1918–19. Rackow's most famous action was leading the capture of Fort Vaux during the Battle of Verdun.

== Early life and career ==
Born on 20 August 1893, Rackow was introduced into the Cadet Corps at an early point of his life. He joined the Imperial German Army's 158th Paderborn Infantry Regiment (Note: German: Paderborn Infanterie-Regiment 158, also known as 7th Lorraine, part of the 13th Infantry Division. In 1915, the regiment was transferred to the 50th Infantry Division.) as Fahnenjunker (officer cadet) in 1912. By the time World War I broke out in 1914, he had risen to second lieutenant. Rackow took part in the initial German invasion of Belgium and France. He served with distinction as adjutant, fighting at Charleroi, St. Quentin, and taking part in the First Battle of the Marne, First Battle of the Aisne, and the First Battle of Artois. In September 1915, he was appointed commander of the 158th Paderborn Infantry Regiment's 3rd company. With this unit, he participated in the Second Battle of Champagne during which he was wounded twice. In the first case, he was hit by shrapnel in his right foot, but fought on, only to be heavily wounded north of Le Mesnil three days later. He was hospitalized, and returned to the 3rd company in February 1916.

== Battle of Verdun ==
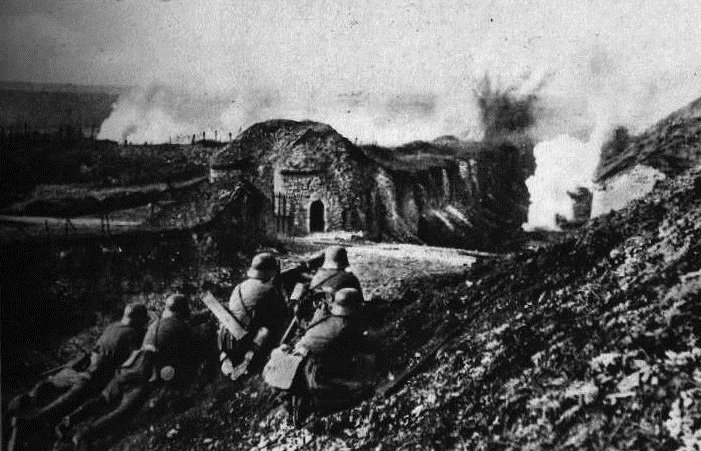
German soldiers attack Fort Vaux, 1916.

At this point, the 158th Paderborn Infantry Regiment was part of the German force that attempted to capture Verdun. Leading the regiment's 1st company, Rackow was ordered to assault the heavily fortified French-held Fort Vaux on 2 June 1916. Rackow personally led the attack, but he and his men were subjected to "murderous shelling" as well as heavy machine gun fire. In order to facilitate a breakthrough, Rackow ordered German pioneers with specifically modified flamethrowers to attack the defenders at the fort's northwestern double gallery at about 5 a.m. The flamethrowers proved ineffective against the fortifications and caused few casualties, but still surprised the French. The machine guns were thus silenced, allowing Rackow and about thirty men to slip across the moat. They were the first Germans to reach Fort Vaux's superstructure. Regardless, the French quickly resumed their machine gun fire, trapping Rackow and his comrades next to the fort from about 5 a.m.

Rackow and his isolated group shouted for support, but their comrades did not hear them. Even though they were located just 20 feet (6.1 m) away, the "terrible din" of the constant artillery bombardment drowned out their voices. The French continued to target Rackow's party, but they managed to hold out. In the afternoon, German pioneers of the Reserve Pioneer Battalion No. 20 led by Lieutenant Ruberg finally located a weak point in the fortification and detonated several demolition charges, forcing the French defenders to retreat. This allowed further German forces to cross the moat, reinforcing Rackow's group. At this point, the Germans held the fort's exterior defenses as well as the superstructure. As the highest-ranking officer present, Rackow assumed command of the further assault. He ordered Lieutenant Ruberg to open the way into the fort's depths by destroying a steel door at the northeastern corridor. Although Ruberg accomplished the task, he was wounded by the explosion of his charges and the French used the ensuing hesitation among the Germans to blockade the corridor.

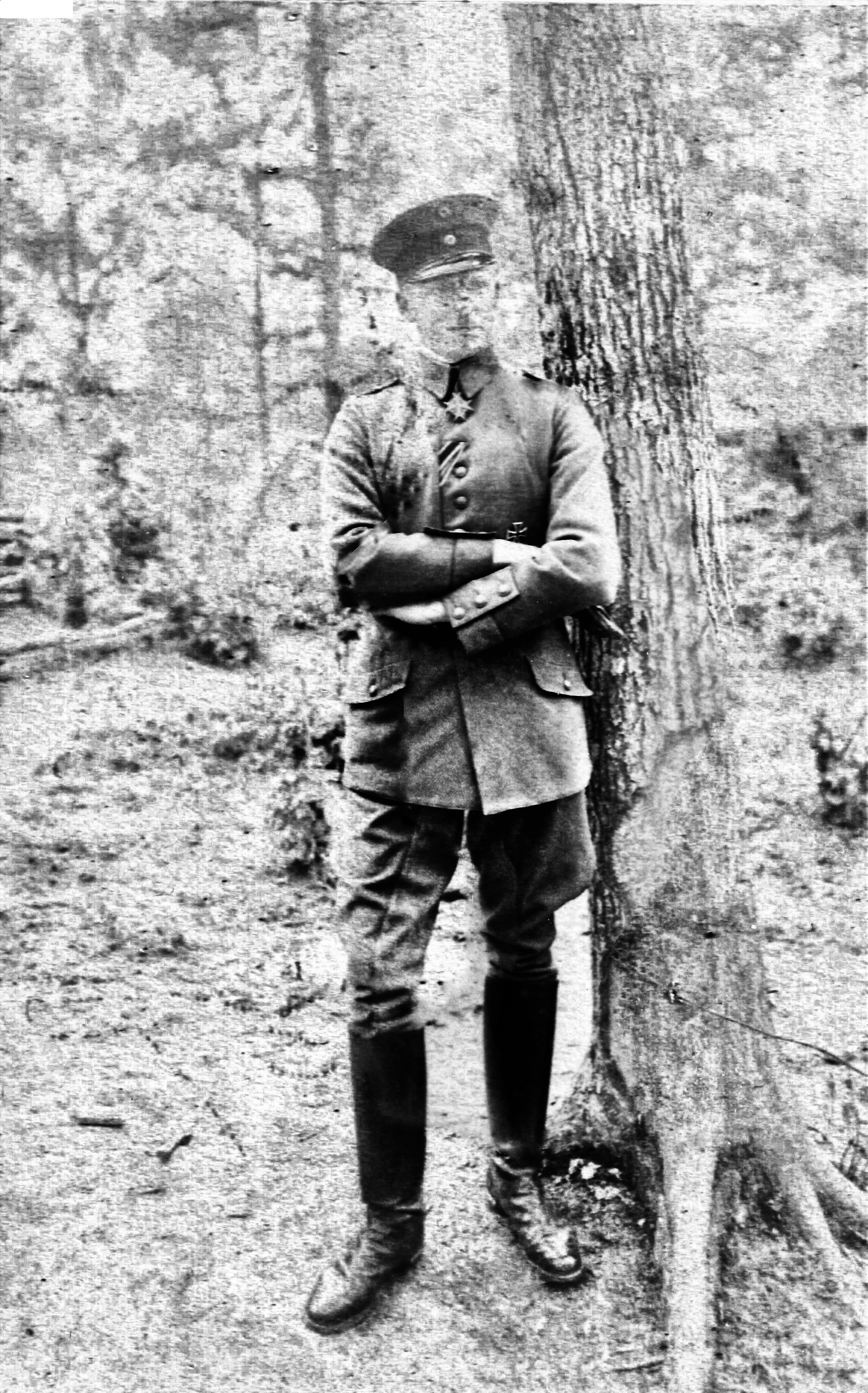
Rackow after the Battle of Verdun.

As result, the situation at Fort Vaux had become a stalemate. The French were cut off from support, but the Germans could not advance any further. Rackow and his men were thus forced to stay on the fort's roof, besieging the French below. Already decimated by the initial assault on the fortifications, Rackow's force suffered further losses as French artillery targeted their position. The Germans had to withdraw from the roof on the night of 3 June. The Imperial German Army continued to attack on the following days, but they were unable to dislodge the French. Fort Vaux's garrison was eventually forced to surrender on 7 June after having exhausted their water supplies. The Germans lost 2,742 soldiers killed in action during the battle for the fort, while the French suffered about 100 fatal casualties. For his role in the capture of Fort Vaux, Rackow was promoted to Oberleutnant (senior lieutenant) and awarded the Pour le Mérite, Germany's highest order of merit, by Crown Prince Wilhelm at Stenay on 7 June 1916. He was one of Germany's youngest knights of the Pour le Mérite, along with Oswald Boelcke and Cordt von Brandis. On the occasion of Rackow's bestowal, the three posed with the Crown Prince for a "famous" photo. He continued to serve with the 158th Paderborn Infantry Regiment for the rest of the war.

== German Revolution and later life ==
In the course of the German Revolution of 1918–19, Rackow joined Freikorps Gabcke in late May 1919. The paramilitary group was supposed to keep order in Düsseldorf, and Rackow led one of its sub-units until August 1919. He then joined the Reichswehr, Germany's new military, and led the 54th Infantry Regiment's 9th company until early June 1920. He retired from the military in late June 1920, married, and acquired a manor, namely Rittergut Groß Moltzow at Kreife. He died on 6 October 1923 in an accident.
