= Sylvain Eugène Raynal =

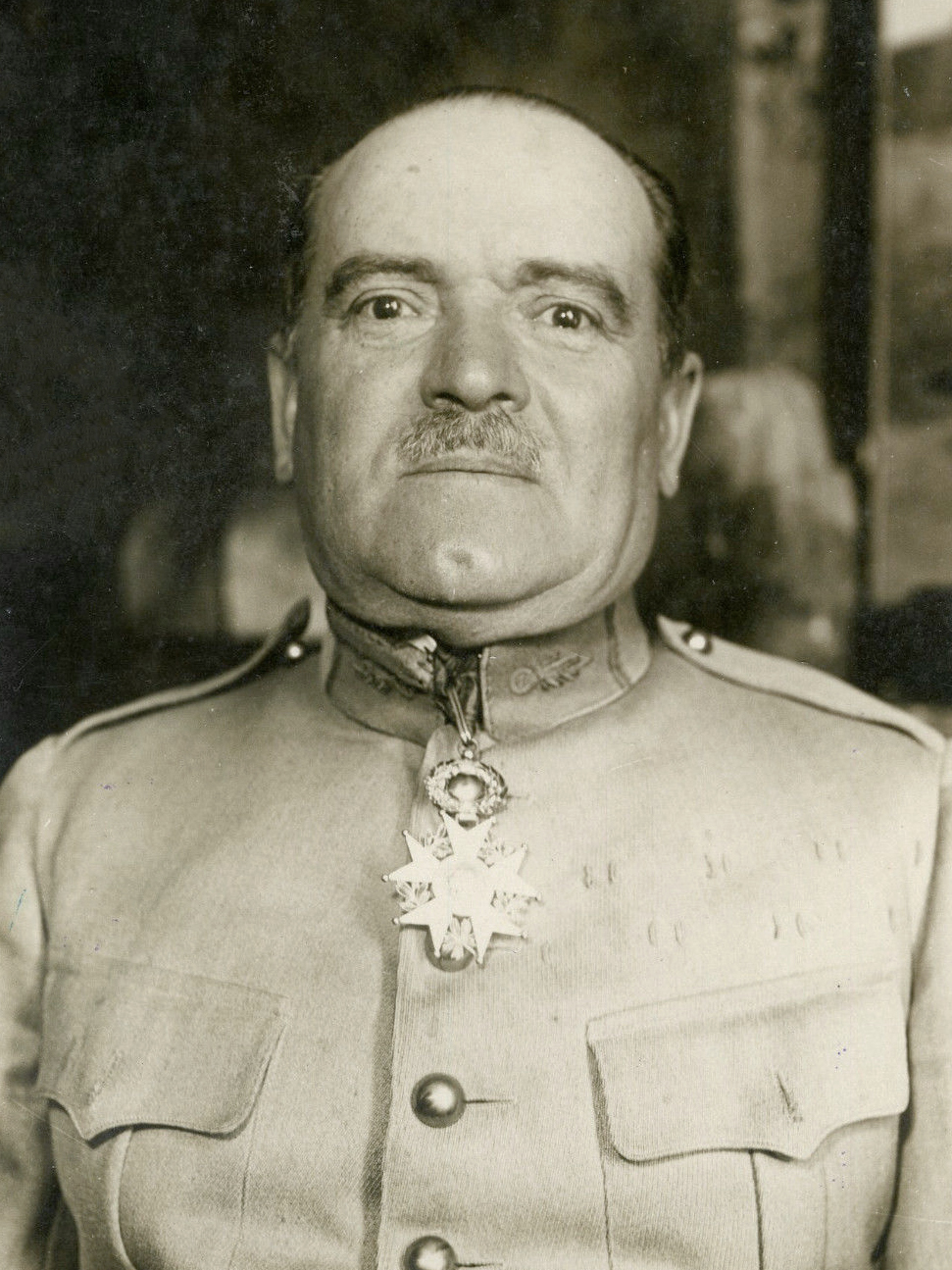
- Raynal in 1930
- Born: 3 March 1867; Bordeaux
- Died: 13 January 1939 (aged 71); Boulogne-Billancourt
- Military career
- Allegiance: French Third Republic
- Branch: Infantry
- Rank: Colonel
- Conflicts: Battle of Verdun
- Awards: Légion d'honneur Croix de Guerre 1914–1918; Ordre des Palmes académiques Nichan Iftikhar

Sylvain Eugène Raynal (3 March 1867 – 13 January 1939) was a French military officer.

== Biography ==
The Fort Vaux was commanded by Raynal who started the war in charge of the 7th Regiment of Algerian Tirailleurs.

He was injured in the shoulder by a bullet from a machine gun in September 1914, and then severely injured in December when his command post was hit by an artillery shell. After ten months in hospital, Raynal came back to the front 1 October 1915, to be again injured in the leg by shrapnel a few days later; he was then promoted to officer of the Legion d'Honneur. Not being able to walk properly seemed to end his military career; however, later in 1916, the Ministry of War in France decided that officers who could not serve on the front line could instead take command of fortresses and other fortifications.

Raynal volunteered himself for the Battle of Verdun, where he was posted commander of the Fort Vaux, which would be attacked by the Germans on 2 June 1916. He led a stout defense of Vaux over six days of brutal combat, with his eventual surrender forced by his men literally dying of thirst. The defense was so heroic that the commander of the German army opposing him, Crown Prince Wilhelm, honored him with a sword to replace the one lost during the battle.

After being taken prisoner on 8 June 1916, Raynal was placed in captivity 11 June 1916 at the Mainz Citadel. He was then moved to Brodnica (Strasburg in Westpreußen or Strasburg an der Drewenz) on 5 November 1917. He was then interned at Interlaken in Switzerland on 30 March 1918, but liberated 4 November 1918.

After the First World War, he was the military commander of the city of Mayence.

Major Raynal was also filled with strong civic engagement: before the war, he had supported the action of Jaurès and Socialist Party. Near the Commander Rossel Captain Henry Gerard collaborator Jaurès The new Army and Military section of Humanity, he was particularly invested in animating the socialist camp "Grand Air" (See: Gilles Candor and Prochasson "Jaurès and the mid Republican officers"), Cahiers Jaurès, 3 in 1994 and The People, 19 June 1916.

== See also ==
- Le Vaillant
