= Le Vaillant =

French pigeon awarded a Legion of Honour

Remains of Fort Vaux, Le Vaillant's plaque is to the left of the entrance

Le Vaillant (French: The Valiant) (died 4 June 1916) was a pigeon used by the French Army in the First World War. The bird was the last held at Fort Vaux before it was overrun in the Battle of Verdun. Le Vaillant carried a message from the fort's commander Sylvain Raynal to his senior officers requesting reinforcements but was mortally wounded in flight. The bird was posthumously appointed to the Legion of Honour and is commemorated by a plaque at the fort.

== Background ==
Fort Vaux was a fortification guarding the north-east approach to the city of Verdun. The fort was besieged by German forces during the 1916 Battle of Verdun and by early June the remaining French garrison was under the command of Commandant Sylvain Raynal. Telephone connection between the fort and the Verdun citadel had been severed by German troops and Raynal's only means of communication was by messenger pigeon, of which he had four.

With German attacks continuing to gain ground Raynal sent the first of his pigeons on 2 June. The message requested that artillery fire be directed upon the fort against German troops that had occupied its upperworks. The pigeon arrived at the citadel, despite injury but had lost the ring containing the message. Raynal's penultimate bird was received and was awarded the Croix de Guerre for its flight.

== Flight of 4 June ==
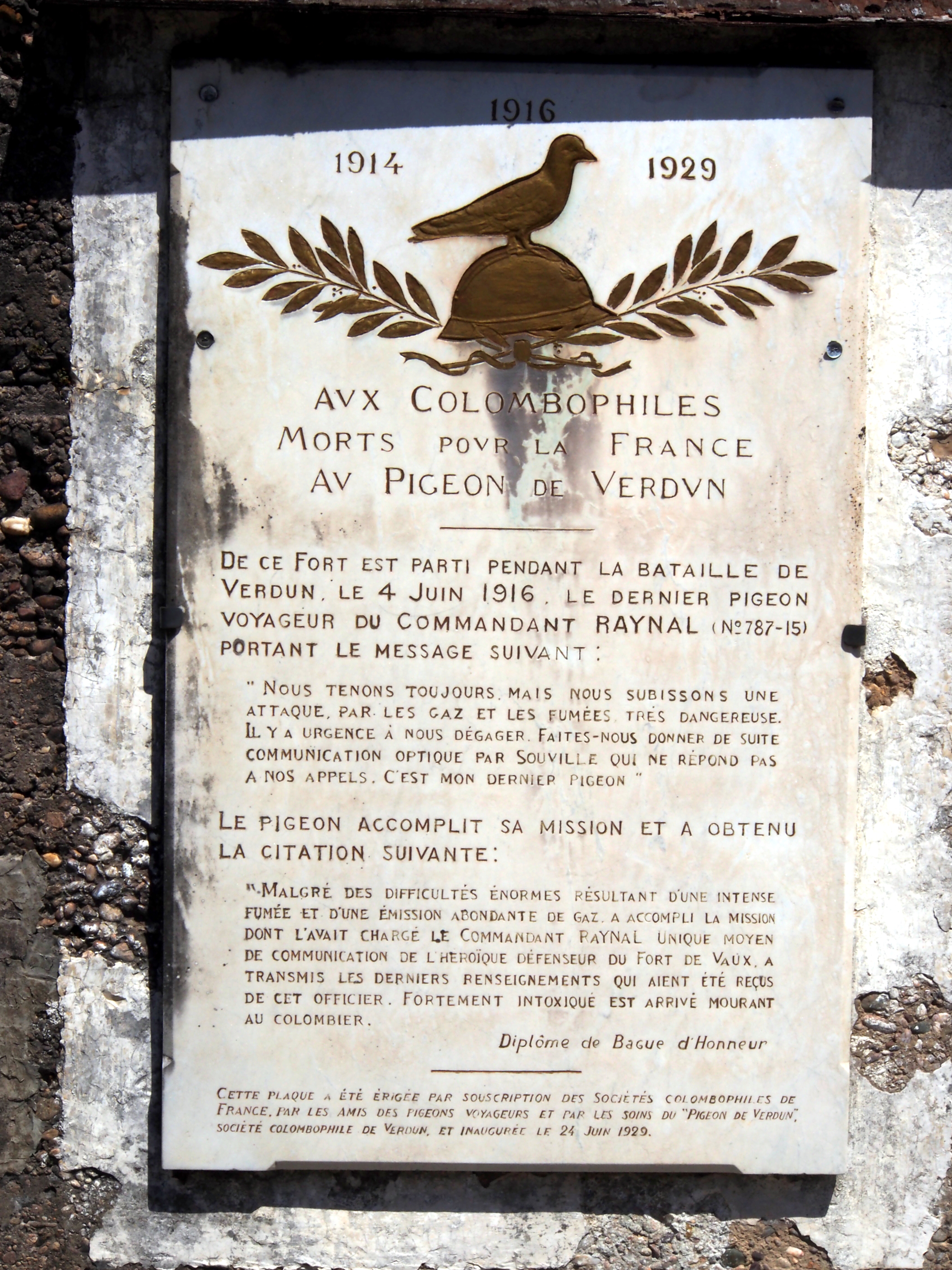
Detail of the plaque

On 4 June Raynal released his last pigeon, number 787.15, named Le Vaillant. The message he bore included the text "we are holding. But ... relief is imperative ... This is my last pigeon". Le Vaillant had been affected by gas released from German shells and was revived by a number of trips to a loophole in Raynal's command post. He set off at 11:30 a.m.

Le Vaillant delivered the message to the dovecot at the citadel. The bird was grievously wounded and died in the hands of the citadel's pigeon master. Because of the message, five relief parties were sent to reinforce Raynal, arriving on 5 June. The garrison lacked water and ammunition and Raynal was forced to surrender his position and 600 surviving troops on 7 June.

== Legacy ==
Le Vaillant was posthumously appointed to the Legion of Honour, the only pigeon to be so rewarded during the war. The diploma of the award hung in the headquarters of the French army signals units. Le Vaillant was stuffed and preserved and is now in the Mont Valérien Military Pigeon Museum in Suresne. Le Vaillant was commemorated by a series of postcards issued after the war. He was formally recorded as Mort pour la France (died for France). A plaque memoralising the bird, with a depiction of him, is in the courtyard of Fort Vaux, being erected by the pigeon fanciers societies of France on 24 June 1929. The French Army perpetuates the history of messenger pigeons and the 8th Signal Regiment maintains a dovecote of 200 pigeons for ceremonial use and in case of all other communications being lost.

== See also ==
- Valiant (film) - about a Second World War British messenger pigeon named Valiant.
