= Fort Vaux =

Fort located in Vaux-Devant-Damloup, Meuse, France

- Part of the Région Fortifiée de Verdun
- Verdun, France
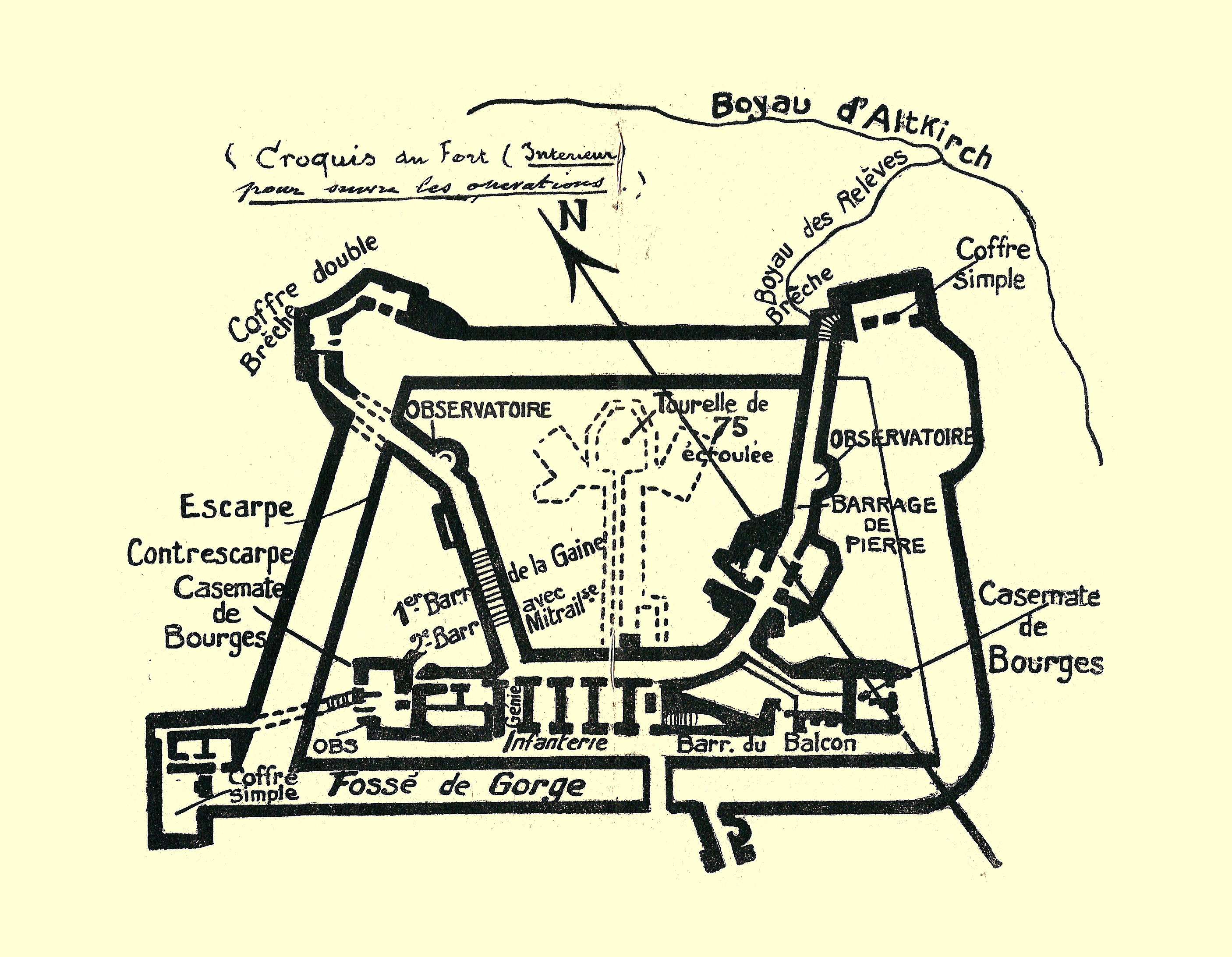
- Diagram of Fort Vaux (1919)

Site information
- Condition: Obsolete

Location
- France Grand Est
- Coordinates: 49°12′00″N 5°28′12″E

Site history
- Fate: Decommissioned
- Battles/wars: 1914: Battle of the Frontiers; 1916: Battle of Verdun; First Offensive Battle of Verdun (1ère Bataille Offensive de Verdun); Second Offensive Battle of Verdun (2ième Bataille Offensive de Verdun); 1917: French attack of August 1917; 1918: Meuse–Argonne offensive (1918)

Fort Vaux (French: Fort de Vaux), in Vaux-Devant-Damloup, Meuse, France, was a polygonal fort forming part of the ring of 19 large defensive works intended to protect the city of Verdun. Built from 1881 to 1884 for 1,500,000 francs, it housed a garrison of 150 men. Vaux was the second fort to fall in the Battle of Verdun after Fort Douaumont, which was captured by a small German raiding party in February 1916 in the confusion of the French retreat from the Woëvre plain. Vaux had been modernised before 1914 with reinforced concrete top protection like Fort Douaumont and was not destroyed by German heavy artillery fire, which had included shelling by 420-millimetre (17 in) howitzers. The superstructure of the fort was badly damaged but the garrison, the deep interior corridors and stations were intact when the fort was attacked on 2 June by German Stormtroops.

The defence of Fort Vaux was marked by the heroism and endurance of the garrison, including Major Sylvain-Eugene Raynal. Under his command, the French garrison repulsed German assaults, including fighting underground from barricades inside the corridors, during the first big engagement inside a fort during the First World War. The last men of the French garrison gave up after running out of water (some of which was poisoned), ammunition, medical supplies and food. Raynal sent several messages by homing pigeon (including Le Vaillant), requesting relief for his soldiers. In his last message, Raynal wrote "This is my last pigeon".

After the surrender of the garrison on 7 June, Crown Prince Wilhelm, the commander of the 5th Army, presented Major Raynal with a French officer's sword as a sign of respect. Raynal and his soldiers remained in captivity in Germany until the Armistice of 11 November 1918. The fort was recaptured by French infantry on 2 November 1916 after an artillery bombardment involving two long-range 400 mm (16 in) railway guns. After its recapture, Fort Vaux was repaired and garrisoned. Several underground galleries were dug to reach far outside the fort, one of them being 1.5 km (1 mi) long, the water reserve was quadrupled and light was provided by two electric generators. Some damage from the fighting on 2 June can still be seen. The underground installations of the fort are well preserved and are open to the public for guided visits.

== Battle of Verdun ==
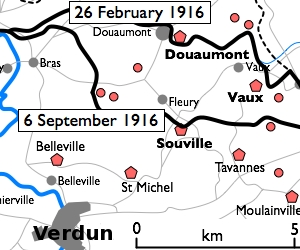
Verdun forts, Vaux upper right; German advances to 26 February and 6 September 1916 in black, the river Meuse in blue at left

- 11 September 1914, the 75 mm turret fires 22 rounds at a German detachment in the Bois de Mabras.
- 18 February 1915, the fort is bombarded for the first time by twelve 420 mm rounds which causes little damage.
- End of 1915, disarmament of the fort is carried out to send the guns and ammunition to the front-line. The four 75 mm guns are removed from the casemates, leaving only the two in the turret.
- In January 1916, enough gunpowder stored for the possible destruction of the fort in case of an enemy approach.
- From 21 to 26 February 1916, the fort is bombarded with shells of all sizes including 129 heavy shells. Pillboxes and armoured observatories are damaged and the gallery leading to the 75 mm turret was cut.
- Late February – early March 1916, the fort is frequently bombarded and the 75 mm turret is destroyed accidentally by heavy shells that cause the demolition explosives within to detonate.
- 14 May 1916, Commandant Raynal takes command of the fort, which has no artillery.
- 1 June 1916, the Germans begin preparations to enter the fort through the Bois de la Caillett. They cannot be stopped due to the fort having no artillery.

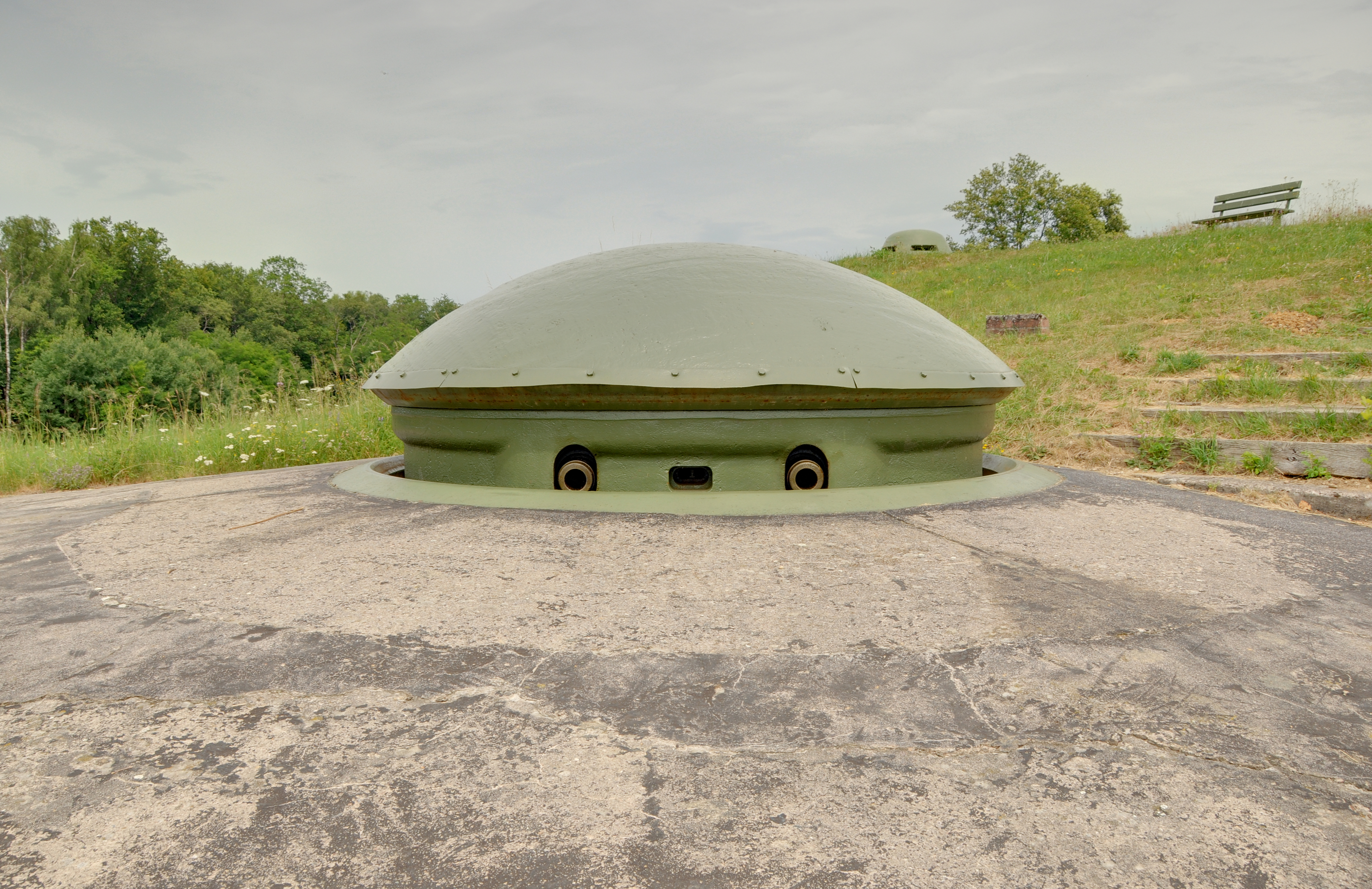
Model "R" 1905 75 mm turret (9 July 2010)

- 2 and 3 June 1916, German troops led by Kurt Rackow attack the fort with flame throwers and force French troops outside to retreat into the fort. The Germans penetrate the fort through the coffers of the counterscarp (contre-escarpe).
- 5 June 1916, Commandant Raynal requests the French army to bomb the fort, where the top is occupied by the Germans, to allow part of the garrison to evacuate the fort.
- 7 June 1916, for three days water supplies are empty and the fighting takes place inside the galleries with grenades, guns and bayonets. Commander Raynal is captured by the Germans under military honours for having fought bravely in extreme conditions with a thirsty garrison.
- From 8 June to 1 November 1916, the fort is used by the Germans as a shelter and command post for the area. The French attempt to retake the fort several times with enormous loss of life. They bombard the fort to destroy it with heavy shells, including super-heavy 400 mm rounds but the concrete walls resist. Life inside the structure becomes impossible and the Germans eventually abandon the fort at the end of October.

Fort Vaux (27 March 2012)

- 2 November 1916, the fort is recaptured without resistance by a French patrol which finds it empty.
- By the end of the battle, in December 1916, the fort is almost in the same condition as it was in June, except for some damage caused by French artillery.
- 1916–1918, the Casemates de Bourges are rehabilitated before being rearmed; an observatory and an armoured command bunker are equipped with machine-guns. Further defences including machine-guns are fitted in place of the 75 mm turret, to defend the area between the ravine and the village of Dieppe-sous-Douaumont. Exits and entrances of the fort are equipped with masonry baffles, machine-guns and grenade launcher chutes. A network of tunnels 17 m (56 ft) long is dug beneath the fort and generators are used for lighting and ventilation.
