= Douaumont-Vaux =

- Commune
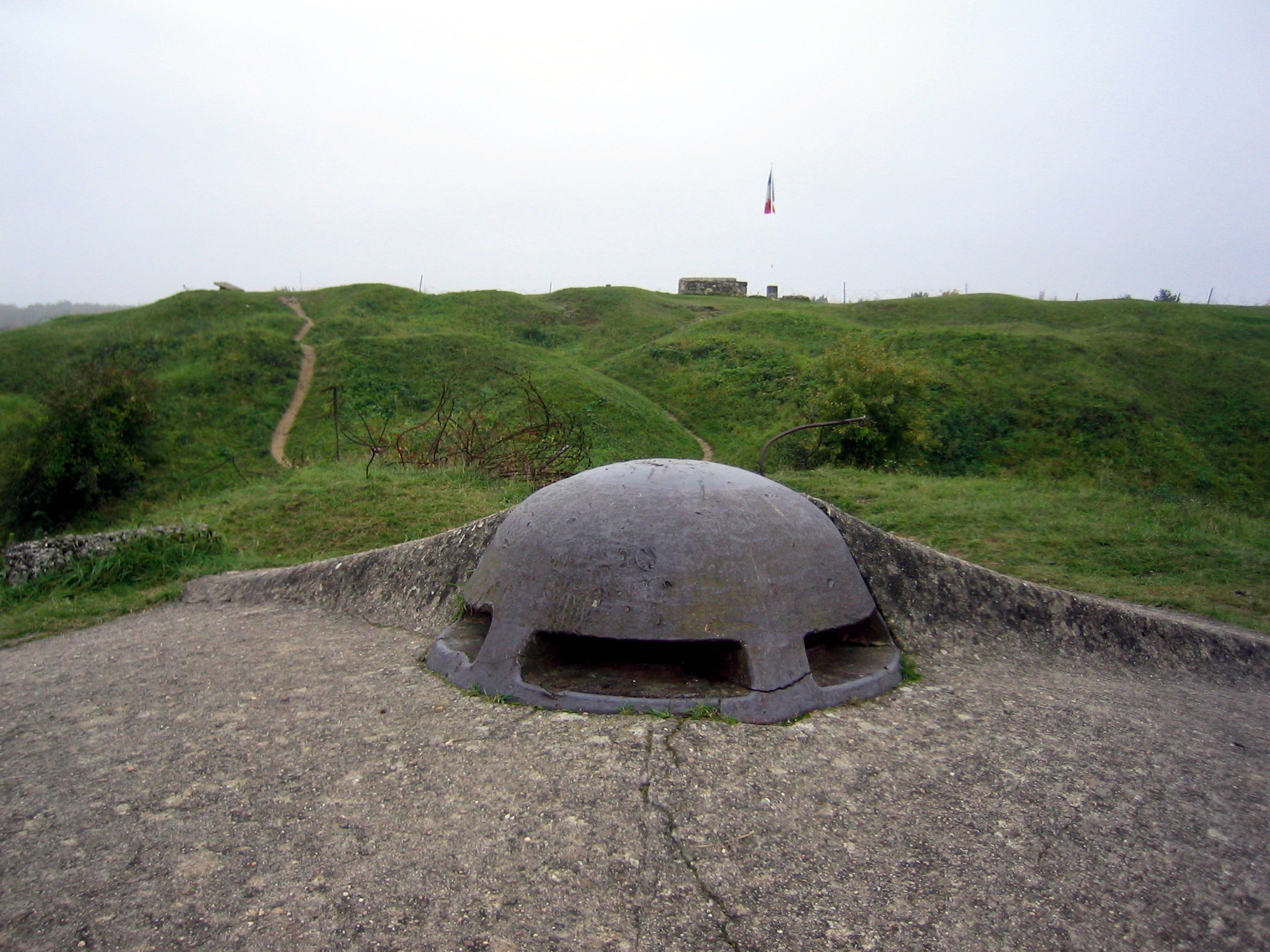
- Fort de Vaux
- Location of Douaumont-Vaux
- Location within France Location within Grand Est
- Coordinates: 49°12′44″N 5°28′24″E
- Country: France
- Region: Grand Est
- Department: Meuse
- Arrondissement: Verdun
- Canton: Belleville-sur-Meuse
- Intercommunality: CA Grand Verdun

Government
  - Mayor (2020–2026): Armand Falque
- Area^{1}: 12.70 km^{2} (4.90 sq mi)
- Highest elevation: 395 m (1,296 ft)
- Lowest elevation: 240 m (790 ft)
- Population (2023): 81
  - Density: 6.4/km^{2} (17/sq mi)
- Time zone: UTC+01:00 (CET)
  - Summer (DST): UTC+02:00 (CEST)
- INSEE/Postal code: 55537 /55400
- ^{1} French Land Register data, which excludes lakes, ponds, glaciers > 1 km^{2} (0.386 sq mi or 247 acres) and river estuaries.

Douaumont-Vaux (French pronunciation: [dwomɔ̃ vo]) is a commune in the Meuse department in Grand Est in north-eastern France. It was established on 1 January 2019 by merger of the former communes of Vaux-devant-Damloup (the seat) and Douaumont.

== See also ==
- Communes of the Meuse department
