= Fabrikant =

Fabrikant is a surname typical to Russian Jews:

- Anat Fabrikant, olympic sailor
- Janika Fabrikant, French-Swiss painter
- Sara Irina Fabrikant, Swiss geographer
- Valentin Fabrikant, scientist
- Valery Fabrikant, associate professor of mechanical engineering

== See also ==
- Fabricant (disambiguation)
