= Fabricant =

Fabricant may refer to:

- Florence Fabricant, American cookbook writer
- Michael Fabricant (born 1950), British Conservative Party politician
- Fabricant, the second novel in the Originator pair by Claire Carmichael

== See also ==
- Fabrikant, a surname
- Union des Fabricants
