= Pierre Delval =

French criminologist and forensic scientist, specialized in counterfeiting

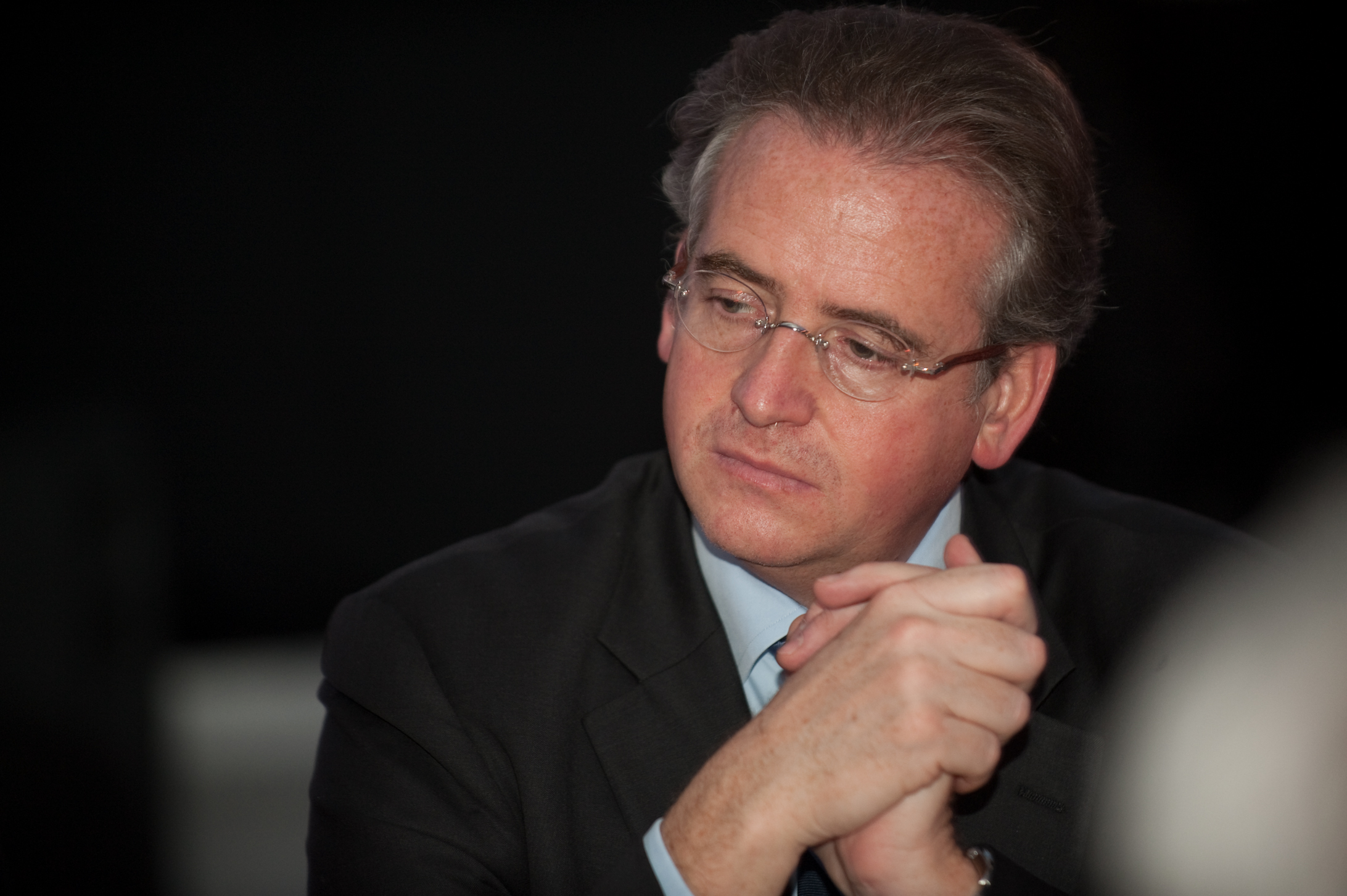
Pierre Delval

Pierre Delval (born May 30, 1960, in Verdun, France) is a French criminologist and forensic scientist, specialized in counterfeiting and counterfeit-crime. He is the President and founder of the Swiss WAITO Foundation, the first nongovernmental organization to deal with the criminal aspect of counterfeiting, contraband and food fraud at an international level. He is the author of several publications on counterfeit consumer goods and fiduciary documents. He is regularly consulted by the Parliamentary Assembly of the Council of Europe and the United Nations on the latest issues regarding the convergence between consumer protection and human rights. Often criticized by intellectual property rights protection associations for his alternative policy in the fight against dangerous counterfeiting, Delval's plan of action is still essentially focused on consumer protection as concerns safety and public health, and the defense of states' economic interests and assets.

== Career ==
Pierre Delval's career is distinguished by its exceptional uniqueness. Delval followed an educational path which was scientific as well as legal and literary, including bachelor's degrees in the history of art (musicology, art history and archaeology) and in history, a Master's in art conservation science and technology for paintings and graphic documents, and postgraduate studies in mineralogical chemistry with a specialization in criminology.

From his first years at university, he was convinced that art, law and the sciences can provide common points in the fight against fake works of art. As a doctoral candidate in 1984, he chose an assignment of sixteen months study at the Scientific Police Laboratory of Paris (Laboratoire de Police scientifique de Paris), then known as the Criminal Identification Laboratory of Paris (Laboratoire d’Identité Judiciaire de Paris). Delval very quickly attracted the attention of Professor Pierre Fernand Ceccaldi, Director of the Laboratory and an internationally renowned criminalist and forensic scientist. He was sent to the Lausanne Institute of Criminalistics (Institut de Criminalistique de Lausanne), the world's leading scientific police school, in order to specialize in the scientific analysis of forged documents.

The Professor Jacques Mathyer, Director of this Institute, encouraged Delval to continue on this path by training him in the new methods of forensic investigation of counterfeit currency. On his return to France in 1985, he was offered the opportunity of presenting himself to Jacques Genthial, director of the newly established PTS, the French Technical and Scientific Police (Police Technique et scientifique française), created by Pierre Joxe, Interior Minister at the time. Delval received an appointment as an Engineer at the Vice-Directorate (Sous-Direction) of the PTS. He was in charge of developing new technologies for criminal investigation within the five national laboratories and took scientific responsibility for the forged documents department of the Criminal Identification Laboratory of Paris, which had just received the new title of Scientific Police Laboratory of Paris. Delval contributed to the rapid improvement of these five French laboratories, which had been particularly affected by thirty years of opposition to change, and focused on the application of fundamental research in the fields of voice recognition and surface morphology analysis to criminalistics. Similarly, he prompted the French Ministry of the Interior to invest in scanning electron microscopy, making it possible to work on trace elements/trace evidence at the infinitesimal level.

Delval was passionately interested in detection methods for fake works of art and convinced that expert evidence based on iconographical analysis from art specialists alone is not enough to discover the truth. In 1986 he secured a scientific and technical partnership between the laboratory of the French Museums Service (Direction des Musées de France) and the PTS. During this period the French Scientific Police became aware of the value of exchanging expert knowledge with the largest French research laboratories, major universities, Écoles, and foreign crime-detection laboratories, including the BKA. The fields that required analysis and involvement on the part of the scientific police included forged documents, counterfeit currency, and the authentication of terrorist tracts and anonymous letters. At that time, this principally involved the demands of the Action Directe group and the beginnings of international terrorism.

=== From smart cards to identity cards ===
In spite of the arrival, in 1986, of professor Michèle Rudler at the head of the Scientific Police Laboratory of Paris and the materialisation of her modernisation work in the laboratories, Delval left the PTS in 1987 and joined the Groupement d’Intérêt Economique Cartes Bancaires (CB Bank Card Group: France's national inter-bank network). He was responsible for smart card security and its application throughout French national territory and became an expert in the fight against electronic banking forgery. He put in place the policy of security approval for bank smart card production sites and of personalisation, a policy which was later taken up by card issuers Visa and Mastercard, within the framework of the international EMV process.

In January 1989, on the strength of his rare know-how, he created his own research and design firm, Saqqarah, specialised in the protection of high-security documents. In the course of his duties as national Inspector for the French Bank Cards GIE group, Delval also worked for public and semi-public institutions such as the Française des jeux (French national lottery) detecting security weaknesses in fiduciary and identity documents and documents establishing legitimate rights.

In 1993, Delval moved to a different environment once again, this time developing a piece of private international engineering dedicated to the protection of fiduciary currencies and identity documents against forgeries affecting the state or involving organised crime. His project was an international first: combining fiduciary security traditions with microprocessing procedures on the world's first identity and voter registration smart card on behalf of the Paraguayan State. Several other similar projects immediately followed in East Africa and in the Gulf.

In January 1994, Delval was appointed by the Iraqi Government to examine the possibility of creating a national official government printing works, capable of halting the wave of forgeries affecting the State in provenance from Asia Minor. Iraq was under international embargo and certain states were attempting to destabilise the Ba'athist economy, which had already been weakened by the long war against Iran and recent UN economic sanctions. Delval spent seven years working with Europe, Iraq and the UN, trying to find the technical, financial and political solutions necessary to put anti-forgery measures in place in Baghdad, while respecting the conditions set by the UN Security Council.

In January 1997, Saqqarah became Saqqarah International, a subsidiary of the French Imprimerie Nationale (the official printing works of the French government). Delval, who at that time was the Director of this subsidiary, continued his assignment in Iraq in the context of an increasingly complex geopolitical environment in Asia Minor. He was faced with an Anglo-American administration hostile to any Russian, French or Chinese action aimed at softening the embargo. Between 1998 and 2000, Delval was frequently denounced by the Anglo-Saxon press as being a contact man between the elite of the Ba’athist regime and the French government, an accusation that Delval has always denied, as has the French Ministry of Foreign Affairs. The project was approved by the UN Security Council in February 2001, but the September 11 attacks prevented its implementation.

From 2000 to 2003, Delval worked to put in place an electronic identity card in Sudan. The primary objective was the census of the population during the Darfur Conflict. The effects of this new assignment were considerable in highlighting the massive population movements.

=== Within the Imprimerie Nationale ===
In 2003, the new Director of the Imprimerie Nationale, Loïc de la Cochetière, asked Delval to leave Saqqarah International in order to take up a position as his Special Advisor in the fight against infringements of intellectual property and patent and trademark rights. The study that he conducted, between June and December 2003, shows the weaknesses of the means of establishing proof of counterfeiting, with regard to fast-moving consumer goods. Delval concluded that it was necessary to implement a policy of technical prevention and dissuasion against counterfeit goods and recommended the use of secure authentication and traceability marking to fight against organised crime's interest in this very lucrative offence. This concept attracted the interest of Nicolas Sarkozy, who was then Ministre d’État (an honorary title conferred on French government ministers) and Minister for the Economy, Finances and Industry. On 27 March 2004 he appointed Delval Chargé de mission for his Ministry and, in April of the same year, he included the Policy of technical prevention and dissuasion among the 11 national measures of action against counterfeiting ratified by the French Council of Ministers.

The initiatives undertaken by Delval went beyond the established framework of the Imprimerie Nationale and its planning was henceforth elaborated in inter-ministerial terms. After the departure of Nicolas Sarkozy from the Ministry of Finance in June 2004, Patrick Devedjian and François Loos, at the Ministry of Industry, continued to promote and extended Delval's initiative, with the support of Jean-François Copé, Minister for the Budget and for the Directorate-General of Customs and Indirect Taxes.

From that time onwards, Delval argued for the setting up of a dedicated, consistent and standardised system, which would make it possible for the arsenal of repressive measures to be applied and for proof of serious fraud – or even of the will to harm the livelihood of others – to be established before the courts, where it is required. In accordance with the spirit of this concept of adapted protection, with a strong orientation towards criminal justice, Delval focused his efforts on standardisation by taking up the Chairmanship of the AFNOR ACZ 60100 Agreement, which was signed by the great majority of participants – industrialists, cross-industry federations and Public Authorities – in 2006.

All that remained to be done was the creation of a real international technical operational centre, grouping together the means necessary for the fight against counterfeiting and equipped with the necessary tools of legitimacy, traceability and control. At the end of 2006, the latter initiative met with disagreement on the part of the Unifab (Union des Fabricants, a French organisation of companies and industrial associations). The Unifab opposed Delval's initiative and obtained the withdrawal of his project by the Ministry of Industry. Nevertheless, the Council of Europe, with its 47 Member States, showed its agreement with Delval, as from 2006, through the Parliamentary Assembly's ratification of the convention on the necessity of a political, legal and technological alternative with regard to the fight against dangerous counterfeiting (counterfeiting-crime).

== Creation of the WAITO Foundation ==
Convinced that the fight against counterfeiting should be conducted through criminal justice channels and not solely through intellectual property rights and that counterfeiting is becoming increasingly dangerous for consumer safety and health, Delval decided to conduct his campaign at the international level and moved to Switzerland where, in June 2007, he found the expected support from industry and from international organisations in the fight against organised crime.

In January 2009, Delval was appointed Chairman of the Swiss Committee for Standardisation, within the SNV (Swiss Association for Standardization), in charge of collaboration on the new international ISO PC246 and TC 247 standards for technical prevention and dissuasion against counterfeiting and fraud in general. These standards are broadly inspired by the AFNOR AC Z60100 Agreement of 2006. He was also appointed by the UNICRI (United Nations Interregional Crime and Justice Research Institute) to work on the creation of an international forum responsible for the fight against dangerous counterfeiting and began establishing links between consumer rights and human rights with the Council of Europe.

In December 2010 – with the support of banks established in Switzerland, the canton of Geneva, criminologists of international renown, and European members of parliament – Delval created the WAITO Foundation: the first international NGO dedicated to the fight against counterfeiting crime and responsible for conducting concrete actions in the face of organised crime and for the protection of consumer citizens. He was appointed Chairman of the Foundation's Board, responsible for coordinating policies of prevention and deterrence against the menace of dangerous counterfeiting, on behalf of states, international organizations, cross-industry federations and large companies.

== Publications ==
- Contacts du 4 type: les OVNI précurseurs de notre avenir, De Vecchi, 1979, ISBN 978-2-85177-109-4
- La Criminalité Internationale des Faux Documents, Pierre Delval, Publisher: Puf, 1998
- Faux et fraudes: la criminalité internationale de faux documents, Presses universitaires de France, 1998, ISBN 978-2-13-049438-6
- Le marché mondial du faux crimes et contrefaçons, Pierre Delval, Preface by Alain Bauer, Publisher: CNRS Editions, Paris, Collection: Arès, 2010, ISBN 978-2-271-06842-2
- La contrefaçon: un crime organisé, Pierre Delval, Guy Zilberstein, Jean-Claude Gawsewitch, Collection: Coup de Gueule, 2008, ISBN 978-2-35013-114-6
- Les Dossiers Européens, Contrefaçon, fraude alimentaire et contrebande: protéger les consommateurs, Editorial by Mr. Kunio Mikuriya, Secretary General of the WCO, "Pour une meilleure protection des citoyens consommateurs: une nouvelle mission pour le Conseil de l’Europe", Pierre Delval, May 2010 - N°19
