= Veneroni =

Veneroni is a surname. Notable people with the surname include:

- Giovanni Veneroni (1642–1708), Vedunian linguist
- Paola Veneroni (1922–2021), Italian actress
