= Capirotada =

Mexican bread pudding made for Lent

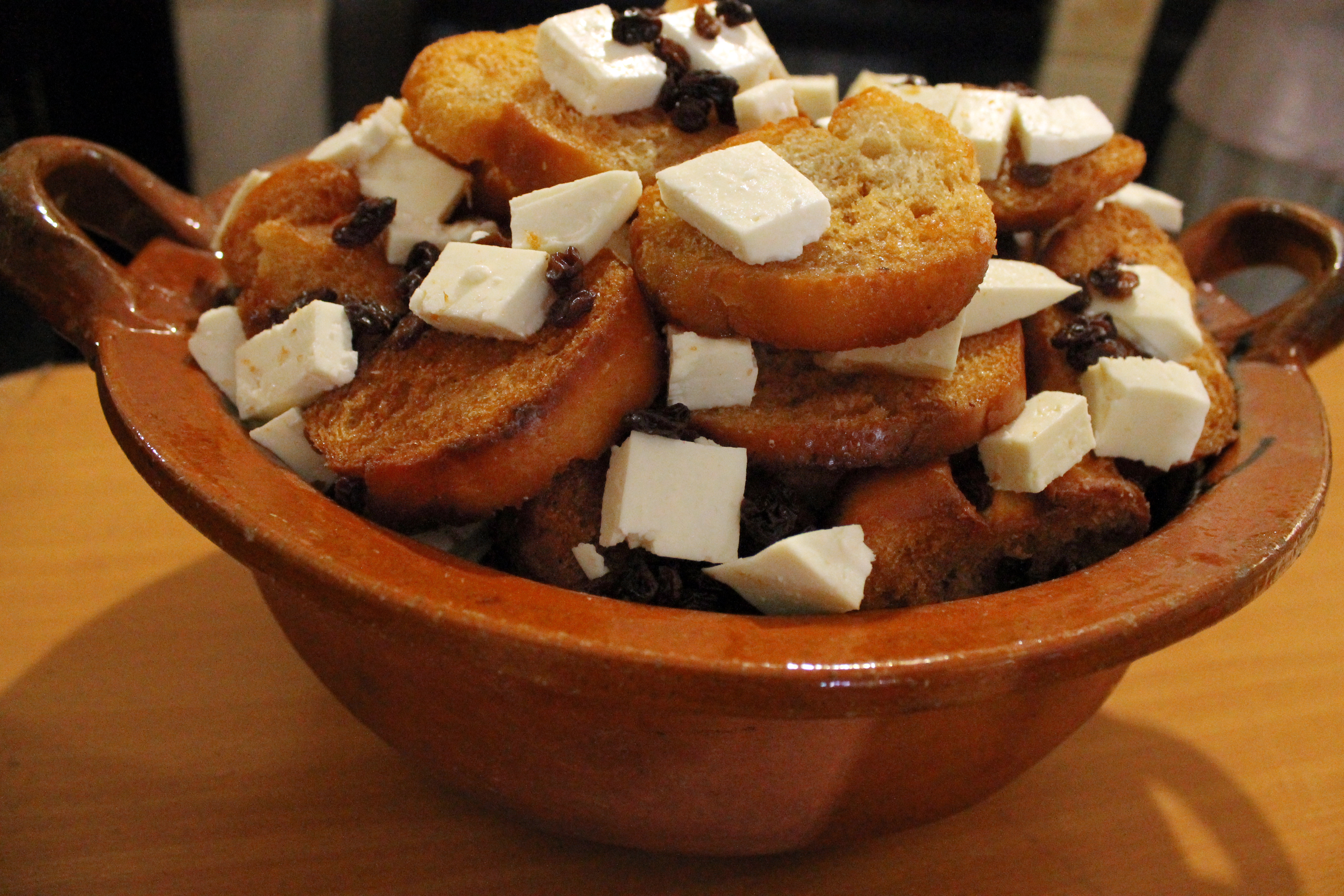
- Type: Bread pudding
- Place of origin: Italy, Spain, Mexico
- Invented: circa 15th century
- Serving temperature: Warm or chilled
- Main ingredients: bolillo, syrup, piloncillo, cinnamon, cheese (if wanted)

Capirotada (Spanish pronunciation: [kapiɾoˈtaða]) or Capilotade, also known as Capirotada de vigilia, is a traditional Mexican food similar to a bread pudding that is usually eaten during the Lenten period. It is one of the dishes served on Good Friday.

== Etymology ==
According to Sebastian de Covarrubias’ 1611 Spanish dictionary —Tesoro de la Lengua Castellana o Española— capirotada is a type of stew that goes over another, covering it like a capirote or hood, and hence, it was called capirotada. But French scholar and philologist, Gilles Ménage, called Covarrubias’ statement ridiculous, stating in his —Dictionnaire Etymologique (1694)— that the term capirotada was of Italian origin and came from capon, quoting Italian linguist, Giovanni Veneroni, who had stated that it was a type of stew or sauce, a capirota, made from roasted meats, including capons and partridges. A capiróta, according to English linguist and translator John Florio’s —A Worlde of Wordes, or Dictionarie of the Italian and English tongues (1598)— is a: “kind of dainty potage or sauce used in Italy”.

== History ==
Capirotada originated from an ancient Medieval European dish that was heavily influenced by Roman and, possibly, Moorish cuisine. One of the oldest predecessors of Capirotada was the Roman dish Sala Cattabia. In the book “De re coquinaria de Apicius ” from the end of the 4th century, which compiled the favorite stews of the Romans of that time, shows a Sala Cattabia recipe, which used pieces of stale bread soaked in water with vinegar, layers of cow cheese, cucumber, capers, cooked chicken liver and covered with a dressing. Capirotada, like bread pudding, was seen as a way to make use of otherwise ruined, stale bread.

In his 1423 Arte Cisoria, Enrique de Villena (1384–1434) repeatedly mentions capirotadas. Felipe Benicio Navarro y Reig (1840-1901), who studied the works and life of Enrique de Villena, described what Capirotada was:

“CAPIROTADA - This was one of those encyclopedic delicacies that was made for magnificence, and in which culinary art applied that reasoned eclecticism that is its essence and must be its purpose. Similar to Olla Podrida in its foundations, it affected more select shapes and constituted a more spectacular dish. It was composed of pork, partridges and sausages, or other foods of this nature, all roasted and cut into medium pieces. With these pieces and slices of bread, alternating layers were formed which were then sprinkled with grated cheese seasoned with pepper, nutmeg and ginger. Forming, then, on the plate, a beautiful pyramid of these various foodstuffs which was then covered with fried eggs, and on top of these a mixed sauce of various compositions, which was generally made with grated cheese, beaten eggs, a little garlic, broth and a little bit of saffron, so that it would look striking after browning the entire dish in the oven. These capirotadas were also made with poultry only, and Don Enrique alludes to them whenever he mentions them. In case there is someone who calls this delicacy absurd, rudimentary and not very fine, it would be good to remind him that the fricassée of the modern masters is nothing more than a capirotada, despite being so old that even the Archpriest of Hita already mentions it as a select delicacy in one of the chapters of his Cantares in which he describes the reception given to Amor by clerics, laymen and friars, saying: «He often ate chickens in capirotada».”

=== Folk History ===
Legend holds that the dish, formally known as capirotada de vigilia, was created in order to use leftovers before Lent began. The word "capirotada" comes from the Spanish word "capirote", which refers to the tall, conical hat in a religious context.

The dish traveled to the New World along with Spanish conquistadores, who spread both the Catholic religion and Spanish culture to the indigenous peoples. In post-conquest Mexico, indigenous peoples like the Aztecs used anise tea to soften stale bread and moisten dry meat, both of which were common problems on Spanish ships making the voyage across the Atlantic. Previously a more savory dish, capirotada progressively became sweeter after New World ingredients and indigenous traditions were combined with the existing Spanish version, leading to a large increase in the varieties of capirotada.

Despite originally being consumed before Lent, capirotada is now consumed during Lent, especially during Holy Week and on Good Friday.

Recently, it has been given a spiritual meaning in relation to the passion of Christ and the Lenten season, thus, for many people, the bread represents the Body of Christ, the syrup is his blood, the cloves are the nails of the cross, and the whole cinnamon sticks are the wood of the cross. The melted cheese stands for the Holy Shroud.

== Ingredients ==
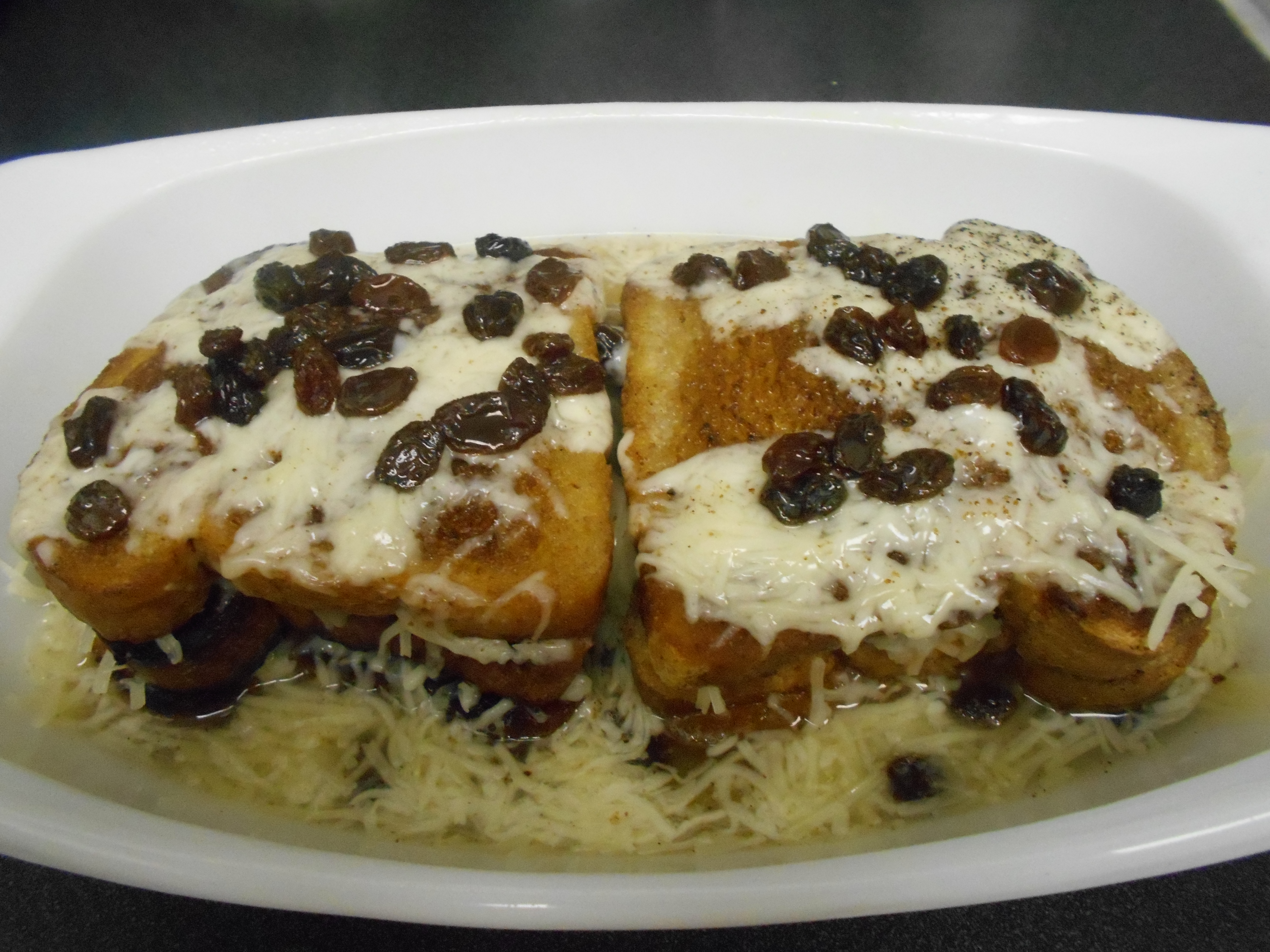
Capirotada

=== Common ingredients ===
There are various preparations of the dish. It is generally composed of toasted bolillo (which is like the French baguette) and soaked in a mulled syrup made of the following: whole cane sugar, which is known as piloncillo; clove; and cinnamon sticks. Some of the typical ingredients include nuts, seeds, and dried (and sometimes fresh) fruits, among these are: apples, dates, raisins, apricots, peanuts, pecans, almonds, pine nuts and walnuts. In addition, aged cheese is added, which might explain why some people's recipes call for milk.

=== Uncommon ingredients ===
Many capirotada recipes do not include any meat due to the dish's traditional association with Lent, though some do include meat as a layer. Some versions of capirotada include tomato and onion for the syrup. Other iterations make use of cilantro, bay leaves, banana, or sprinkles.

== See also ==
- Kugel
- List of Mexican dishes
