= The Originator =

The Originator or Originator may refer to:

- Bo Diddley (1928–2008), American blues and rock and roll musician, or his 1966 studio album The Originator
- DJ Screw (1971–2000), American DJ
- U-Roy (1942–2021), Jamaican reggae musician
- Originator (novel), a 1998 novel by Claire Carmichael

== See also ==
- The Originators (disambiguation)
