= Claire McNab =

Australian writer, pen name of Claire Carmichael

Claire Carmichael (1940 – 2022), also known by her pen name Claire McNab, was an Australian writer born in Melbourne. While pursuing a career as a high school teacher in Sydney, she began her writing career with comedy plays and textbooks. She left teaching in the mid-1980s to become a full-time writer. In her native Australia, she is known for her self-help and children's books.

She was best-known for 14 crime novels featuring Detective-Inspector Carol Ashton and six featuring undercover agent Denise Cleever. Her latest series features Kylie Kendall, an Australian transplanted to Los Angeles, who determines to become a private investigator in order to pursue her father's business and his business partner.

McNab served as the president of Sisters in Crime and was a member of both the Mystery Writers of America and the Science Fiction Writers of America. She is a 2006 Medal Winner of the Alice B. Awards and was nominated for the 1996 Lammy Award Lesbian Mystery Award. She moved to Los Angeles in 1994 after falling in love with an American woman, and taught not-yet-published writers through the UCLA Writers' Extension Program.

In addition to crime fiction, McNab has published children's novels, picture books, self-help, and English textbooks.

== Works ==
Lesbian crime novels
- Carol Ashton Series
  - Lessons In Murder (1988)
  - Fatal Reunion (1989)
  - Death Down Under (1989)
  - Cop Out (1991)
  - Dead Certain/Off Key (1992)
  - Body Guard (1994)
  - Double Bluff (1995)
  - Inner Circle (1996)
  - Chain Letter (1997)
  - Past Due (1998)
  - Set Up (1999)
  - Under Suspicion (2000)
  - Death Club (2001)
  - Accidental Murder (2002)
  - Blood Link (2003)
  - Fall Guy (2004)
  - Lethal Care (2012)
- Denise Cleever Series
  - Murder Undercover (2000)
  - Death Understood (2000)
  - Out of Sight (2001)
  - Recognition Factor (2002)
  - Death by Death (2003)
  - Murder at Random (2005)
- Kylie Kendall Series
  - Wombat Strategy (2004)
  - Kookaburra Gambit (2005)
  - The Quokka Question (2005)
  - Dingo Dilemma (2006)
  - Platypus Ploy (2007)

Lesbian romance

- Under the Southern Cross (1992)
- Off Key (1992)
- Silent Heart (1993)
- Writing My Love (2006)

Non-fiction

- The Loving Lesbian (1997) (with Sharon Gedan)
Sci-fi novels
- Originator (1998) ISBN 978-0-09-182953-7

== See also ==
- Lesbian literature
- List of mystery writers
- List of female detective/mystery writers
- List of female detective characters
- Detective fiction
- Crime fiction
