= Verdun =

Subprefecture and commune in Grand Est, France

- Subprefecture and commune
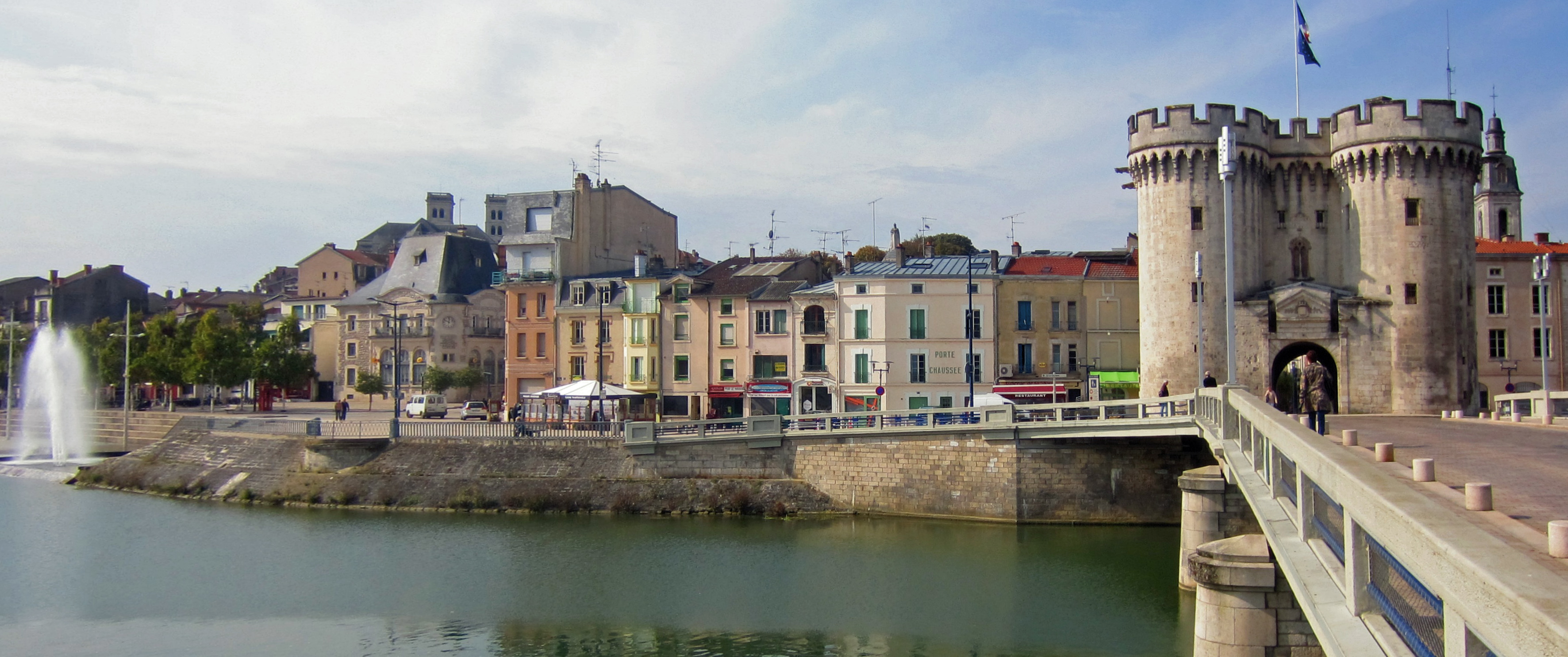
- Verdun and the Meuse river

- Coat of arms
- Location of Verdun
- Location within France Location within Grand Est
- Coordinates: 49°09′43″N 5°23′15″E
- Country: France
- Region: Grand Est
- Department: Meuse
- Arrondissement: Verdun
- Canton: Verdun-1 and 2
- Intercommunality: CA Grand Verdun

Government
  - Mayor (2020–2026): Samuel Hazard
- Area^{1}: 31.03 km^{2} (11.98 sq mi)
- Highest elevation: 330 m (1,080 ft)
- Lowest elevation: 194 m (636 ft)
- Population (2023): 16,890
  - Density: 544.3/km^{2} (1,410/sq mi)
  - Urban: 23,075
- Time zone: UTC+01:00 (CET)
  - Summer (DST): UTC+02:00 (CEST)
- INSEE/Postal code: 55545 /55100
- ^{1} French Land Register data, which excludes lakes, ponds, glaciers > 1 km^{2} (0.386 sq mi or 247 acres) and river estuaries.

Verdun (/vɜːrˈdʌn/ vur-DUN, UK also /ˈvɛərdʌn/ VAIR-dun, US also /vɛərˈdʌn/ vair-DUN; French: [vɛʁdœ̃]; official name before 1970: Verdun-sur-Meuse) is a city in the Meuse department in Grand Est, northeastern France. It is an arrondissement of the department.

In 843, the Treaty of Verdun, which divided the Carolingian Empire into three kingdoms—considered the foundation of Germany and France—was signed there. An episcopal principality of the Holy Roman Empire since the 10th century, Verdun was subjugated by France in 1552, during the "Voyage to Austrasia". Along with the other free cities of the Empire, Metz and Toul, it formed the province of the Three Bishoprics, which was attached to the Kingdom of France in 1648 by the Treaty of Münster.

Verdun is the biggest city in Meuse, although the capital of the department is Bar-le-Duc, which is slightly smaller than Verdun. It is well known for giving its name to the longest battle in modern history in the First World War.

== Geography ==
Verdun is situated on both banks of the river Meuse, in the northern part of the Meuse department. It is connected by rail to Jarny. The A4 autoroute Paris–Metz–Strasbourg passes south of the town.

The commune is located between Paris (225 km) and Strasbourg (184 km). In Lorraine, it is 58 km from Metz (Moselle), 78 km from Nancy (Meurthe-et-Moselle) and 134 km from Épinal (Vosges). It is 47 km north of Bar-le-Duc, the prefecture of the department, and Commercy, the other sub-prefecture.

== History ==
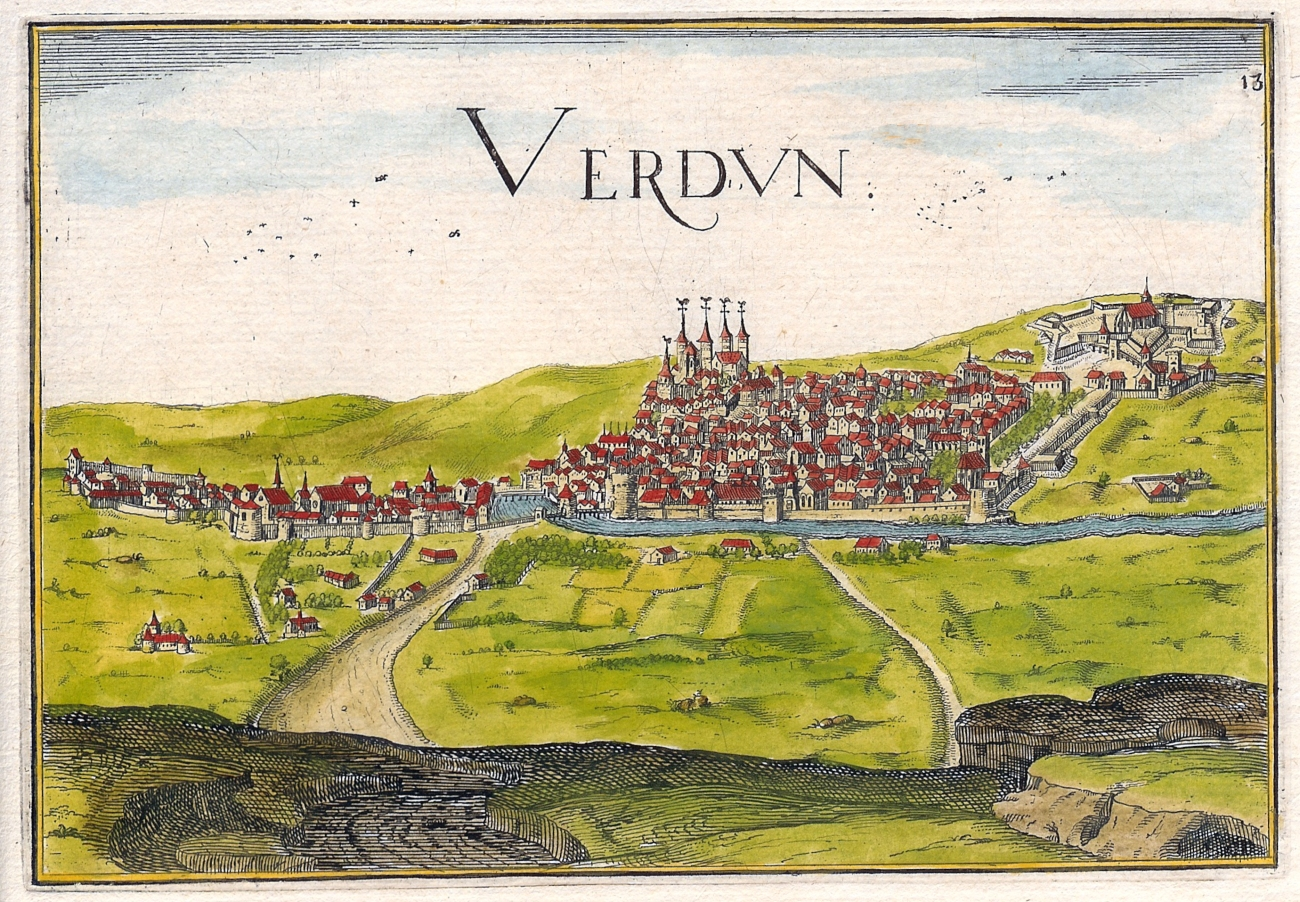
Bird's-eye view of Verdun in 1638

Map of the city and citadel of Verdun (c. 1770)

Verdun (Verodunum, a latinisation of a place name meaning "strong fort" in Gaulish) was founded by the Gauls. It has been the seat of the bishop of Verdun since the 4th century, with interruptions. In 486, following the decisive Frankish victory in the Franco-Roman War, the city (amongst several other nearby cities) refused to yield to the Franks and was thus besieged by King Clovis I. The 843 Treaty of Verdun divided Charlemagne's empire among his three surviving grandsons.

Around this time a city called Verdun was the centre of the thriving European trade in young boys, who were sold to the Islamic emirates of Iberia, where they were enslaved as eunuchs. The Italian ambassador Liutprand of Cremona, as one example in the 10th century, presented a gift of four eunuchs to Emperor Constantine VII. The identity of the "Verdun" mentioned in sources is disputed because there are many cities called Verdun in Europe (such as Verdun-sur-Garonne in Occitania and Verdun-sur-le-Doubs). While many still identify it as Verdun on the Meuse, some argue that Verdun-sur-le-Doubs is a more feasible identification. It is also possible that Liutprand was referring to Verona.

Since 1200 Verdun has been famous for its Dragées or sugared almonds; they were distributed at the baptism of French princes.

Verdun was part of the middle kingdom of Lotharingia and in 1374 it became a free imperial city of the Holy Roman Empire. The Bishopric of Verdun formed together with Tull (Toul) and Metz the Three Bishoprics, which were annexed by France in 1552 (recognized in 1648 by the Peace of Westphalia).

From 1624 to 1636 a large bastioned citadel was constructed on the site of the Abbey of Saint Vanne. In 1670 Sébastien Le Prestre de Vauban visited Verdun and drew up an ambitious scheme to fortify the whole city. Although much of his plan was carried out in the following decades, some of the elements were not completed until after the Napoleonic Wars. During the Napoleonic War the citadel was used to hold British prisoners of war.

In the Franco-Prussian War Verdun was the last French fortress to surrender in 1870. Shortly afterwards a new system of fortification was begun. This consisted of a mutually supporting ring of 22 polygonal forts up to 8 kilometres (5.0 mi) from the city and an inner ring of 6 forts.

=== Battle of Verdun (1792) ===
Despite the extensive fortifications, in the Battle of Verdun in 1792 the fortress was captured by the Prussians during the War of the First Coalition. The battle was fought on 20 August 1792 between French Revolutionary forces and the Prussian army. The Prussian victory opened the path to Paris for the invading armies. However the Prussians were unable to press their success and abandoned Verdun following the Battle of Valmy.

=== Battle of Verdun (First World War) ===
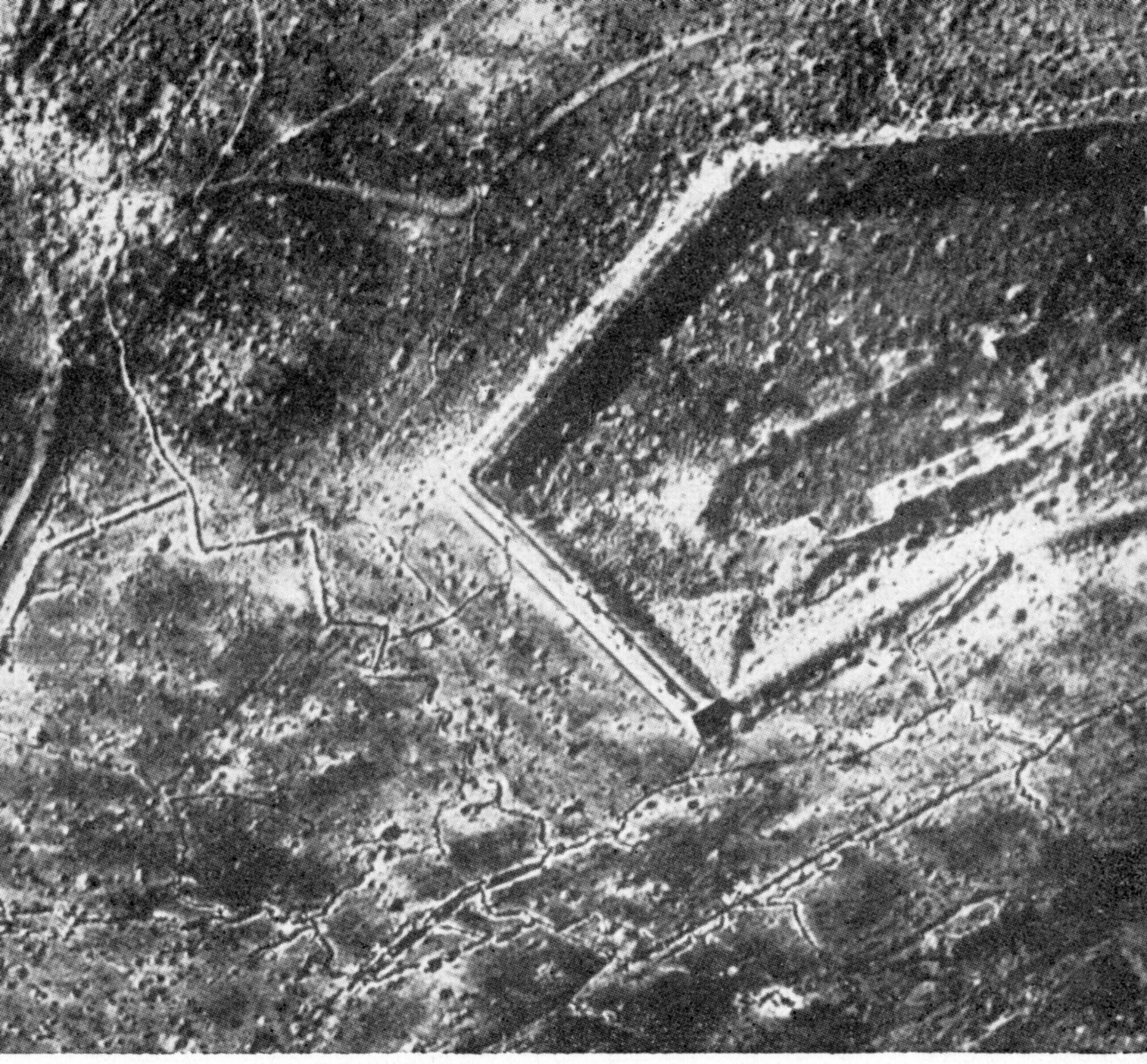
Aerial photograph of Fort Douaumont towards the end of 1916

Verdun was the site of a major battle, the longest-lasting of the First World War. One of the costliest battles in military history, Verdun exemplified the policy of a war of attrition pursued by both sides, which led to an enormous loss of life and very long casualty lists.

Following the failure of the Schlieffen Plan in 1914 and the solidifying of the Western Front, Germany remained on the strategic defensive in the west throughout most of 1915. In the winter of 1915–16, German General Erich von Falkenhayn, the chief of the German General Staff (1914–1916) made plans for a large offensive on the Western Front that ultimately aimed to break the French Army through the application of firepower at a point that the French had to hold for reasons of national prestige. As Falkenhayn recalled it, his so-called "Christmas memorandum" to Kaiser Willhelm II envisioned a massive but limited attack on a French position 'for the retention of which the French Command would be compelled to throw in every man they have'. Once the French army had bled to death, Britain could be brought down by Germany's submarine blockade and superior military strength. The logic of initiating a battle not to gain territory or a strategic position but simply to create a self-sustaining killing ground—to bleed the French army to death—pointed to the grimness of military vision in 1916.

Recent scholarship, by Holger Afflerbach and others, has questioned the veracity of the Christmas memo. No copy has ever surfaced and the only account of it appeared in Falkenhayn's post-war memoir. His army commanders at Verdun, including the German Crown Prince, denied any knowledge of an attrition strategy. It is possible that Falkenhayn did not specifically design the battle to bleed the French army but used this supposed motive after the fact in an attempt to justify the Verdun offensive, despite its failure.

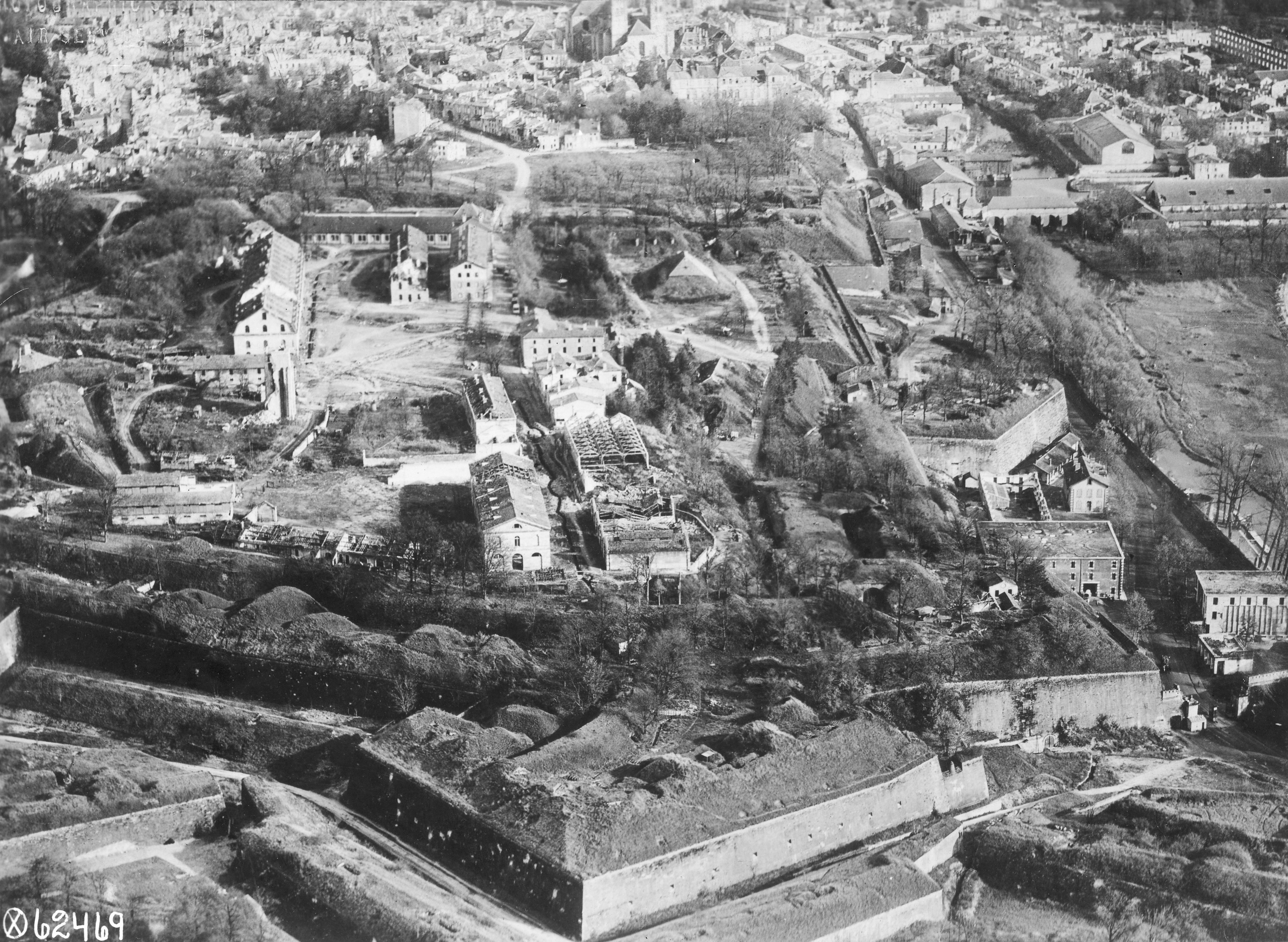
Citadel of Verdun during World War I

Verdun was the strongest point in pre-war France, ringed by a string of powerful forts, including Douaumont and Fort Vaux. By 1916, the salient at Verdun jutted into the German lines and lay vulnerable to attack from three sides. The historic city of Verdun had been an oppidum of the Gauls before Roman times and later a key asset in wars against Prussia, and Falkenhayn suspected that the French would throw as many men as necessary into its defence. Ironically, France had substantially weakened Verdun's defences after the outbreak of the war, an oversight that would contribute to the removal of Joseph Joffre from supreme command at the end of 1916. The attack was slated to begin on 12 February, then 16 February, but the snow forced repeated postponements.

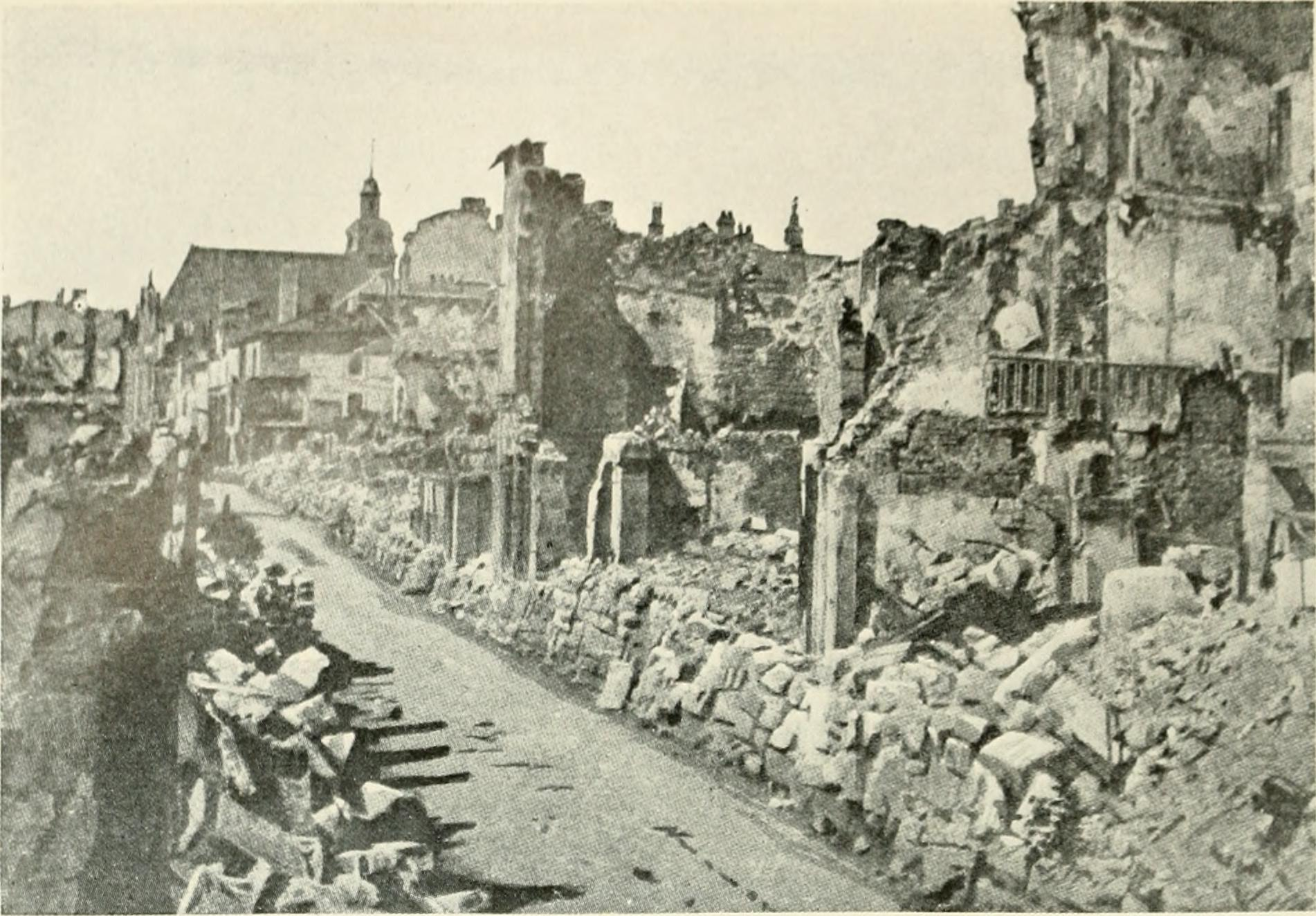
The city after the German bombardment, 1916

Falkenhayn massed over 1000 artillery pieces to the north and east of Verdun to precede the infantry advance with intensive artillery bombardment. His attack would hit the French positions on the right bank of the Meuse. Although French intelligence had warned of his plans, these warnings were ignored by the French Command and troop levels in the area remained low. Consequently, Verdun was utterly unprepared for the initial bombardment on the morning of 21 February 1916. German infantry attacks followed that afternoon and met tenacious but ultimately inadequate resistance for the first four days.

On 25 February, the Germans occupied Douaumont. French reinforcements—now under the leadership of General Philippe Pétain—began to arrive and were instantly thrown into "the furnace" (as the battle was called) to slow the German advance, no matter what the cost. Over the next several days, the stubborn defense managed to slow the German advance with a series of bloody counter-attacks. In March, Falkenhayn decided to target the French positions on the left bank of the Meuse as well, broadening the offensive front twofold. Throughout March and April, Cumières-le-Mort-Homme and Hill 304 were under continuous heavy bombardment and relentless infantry attacks. Meanwhile, Pétain organised repeated, small-scale counter-attacks to slow the German advance. He also ensured that the sole supply road from Bar-le-Duc into Verdun remained open. It became known as the Voie Sacrée "Sacred Way" because it continued to carry vital supplies and reinforcements into the Verdun front despite constant artillery fire.

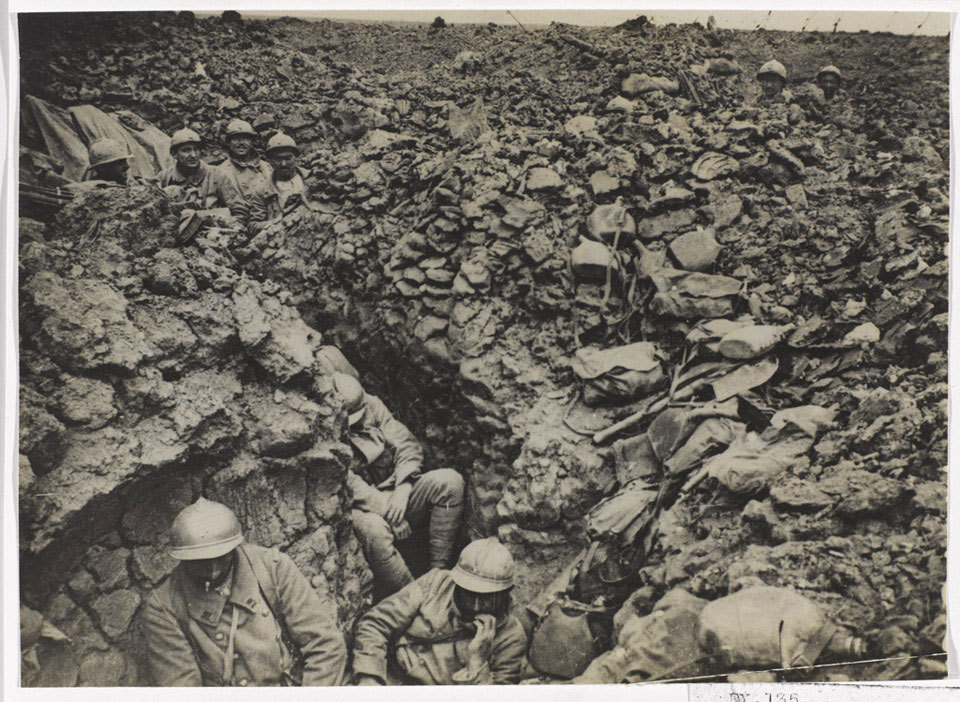
Men of the French 87th Infantry Regiment during the Battle of Verdun, 1916

German gains continued in June, but slowly and only after increasingly heavy losses on their side. On 7 June, following almost a week of bitter resistance, Fort Vaux fell to the Germans after a murderous hand-to-hand fight inside the fort itself. On 23 June, the Germans reached what would become the furthest point of their advance. The line was just in front of Fort Souville, the last stronghold before Verdun itself. Pétain was making plans to evacuate the right bank of the Meuse when the combined Anglo-French offensive on the Somme River was launched on 1 July, partly to relieve pressure on the French, although the first day was the bloodiest in the British Army's history. The Germans could no longer afford to continue their offensive at Verdun when they were needed so desperately on the Somme. At a cost of some 400,000 German casualties and a similar number of French, the attack was finally called off. The estimated death toll on both sides were 143,000 dead Germans and 162,440 French soldiers. Falkenhayn's plan to bleed France to death – if indeed that had been his intention – had failed.

The battle continued, however, from October to the end of the year. French offensives, employing new tactics devised by General Robert Nivelle, regained the forts and territory they had lost earlier. This was the only gleam of hope in an otherwise abysmal landscape.

Overall, the battle lasted 11 months. Falkenhayn was replaced by Paul von Hindenburg as Chief of General Staff. General Nivelle was promoted over the head of General Pétain to replace Generalissimo Joseph Joffre as French supreme commander, although he was to hold the post for less than six months.

== Population ==
Historical population

Year	Pop.	±% p.a.
1793	9,060	—
1800	9,136	+0.12%
1806	10,276	+1.98%
1821	9,819	−0.30%
1831	9,978	+0.16%
1836	10,577	+1.17%
1841	15,533	+7.99%
1846	13,448	−2.84%
1851	13,941	+0.72%
1856	12,742	−1.78%
1861	12,394	−0.55%
1866	12,941	+0.87%
1872	10,738	−3.06%
1876	15,781	+10.10%
1881	16,053	+0.34%
1886	17,755	+2.04%
1891	18,852	+1.21%
1896	22,151	+3.28%
1901	21,360	−0.72%

Year	Pop.	±% p.a.
1906	21,706	+0.32%
1911	21,701	−0.00%
1921	12,788	−5.15%
1926	14,280	+2.23%
1931	16,540	+2.98%
1936	19,460	+3.31%
1946	14,609	−2.83%
1954	18,831	+3.22%
1962	21,982	+1.95%
1968	22,013	+0.02%
1975	23,621	+1.01%
1982	21,516	−1.32%
1990	20,753	−0.45%
1999	19,624	−0.62%
2007	19,147	−0.31%
2012	18,327	−0.87%
2017	17,475	−0.95%
2023	16,890	−0.57%

Source: EHESS and INSEE (1968-2023)

== Panoramic views ==
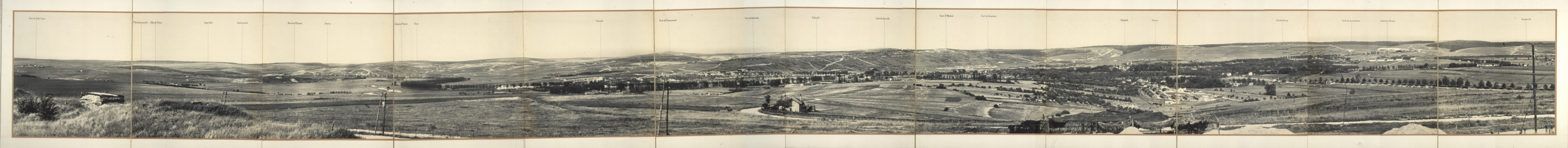
A panoramic view of Verdun in 1917
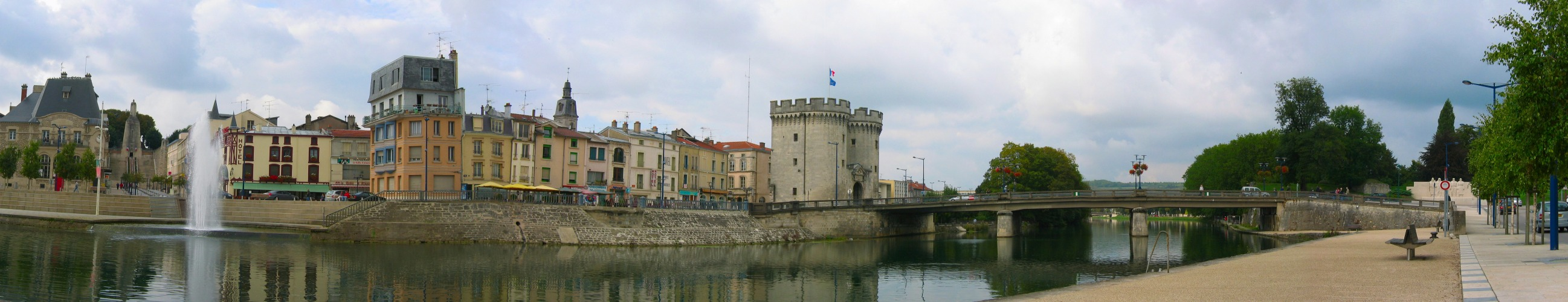
A panoramic view of Verdun from 2004

== Cemetery and memorials ==
There are many French and German cemeteries throughout the battlefield. The largest is the French National Cemetery and Douaumont Ossuary near Fort Douaumont. Thirteen thousand crosses adorn the field in front of the ossuary, which holds roughly 130,000 unidentified remains brought in from the battlefield. Every year yields more remains, which are often placed inside the ossuary's vaults.

Among many revered memorials on the battlefield is the "Bayonet Trench", which marks the location where some dozen bayonets lined up in a row were discovered projecting out of the ground after the war; below each rifle was the body of a French soldier. It has been assumed that these belonged to a group of soldiers who had rested their rifles against the parapet of the trench they were occupying when they were killed during a bombardment, and the men were buried where they lay in the trench and the rifles left untouched. However, this is probably not historically accurate: experts agree that the bayonets were probably affixed to the rifles after the attack and installed by survivors to memorialize the spot.

Nearby, the World War I Meuse-Argonne American Cemetery and Memorial is located at Romagne-sous-Montfaucon to the northwest of Verdun. It is the final resting place for 14,246 American military dead, most of whom died in the Meuse-Argonne Offensive. The chapel contains a memorial to the 954 American missing whose remains were never recovered or identified.

On 12 September 1916 King George V awarded the Military Cross to the City of Verdun, one of only two awards of this British decoration to a municipality during World War I, the other being Ypres. On 5 October 1917, Bernardino Machado, President of the Portuguese Republic, awarded the City of Verdun the Order of the Tower and Sword, 1st Class (Grand Cross) for its "tenacious resistance, steadfastness in battle, and heroism of its garrison, having filled a brilliant position in the present war and gloriously proving the worth of a nation's valour and patriotism"; the investiture ceremony took place on 10 October 1917, during President Machado's visit to the Western Front.

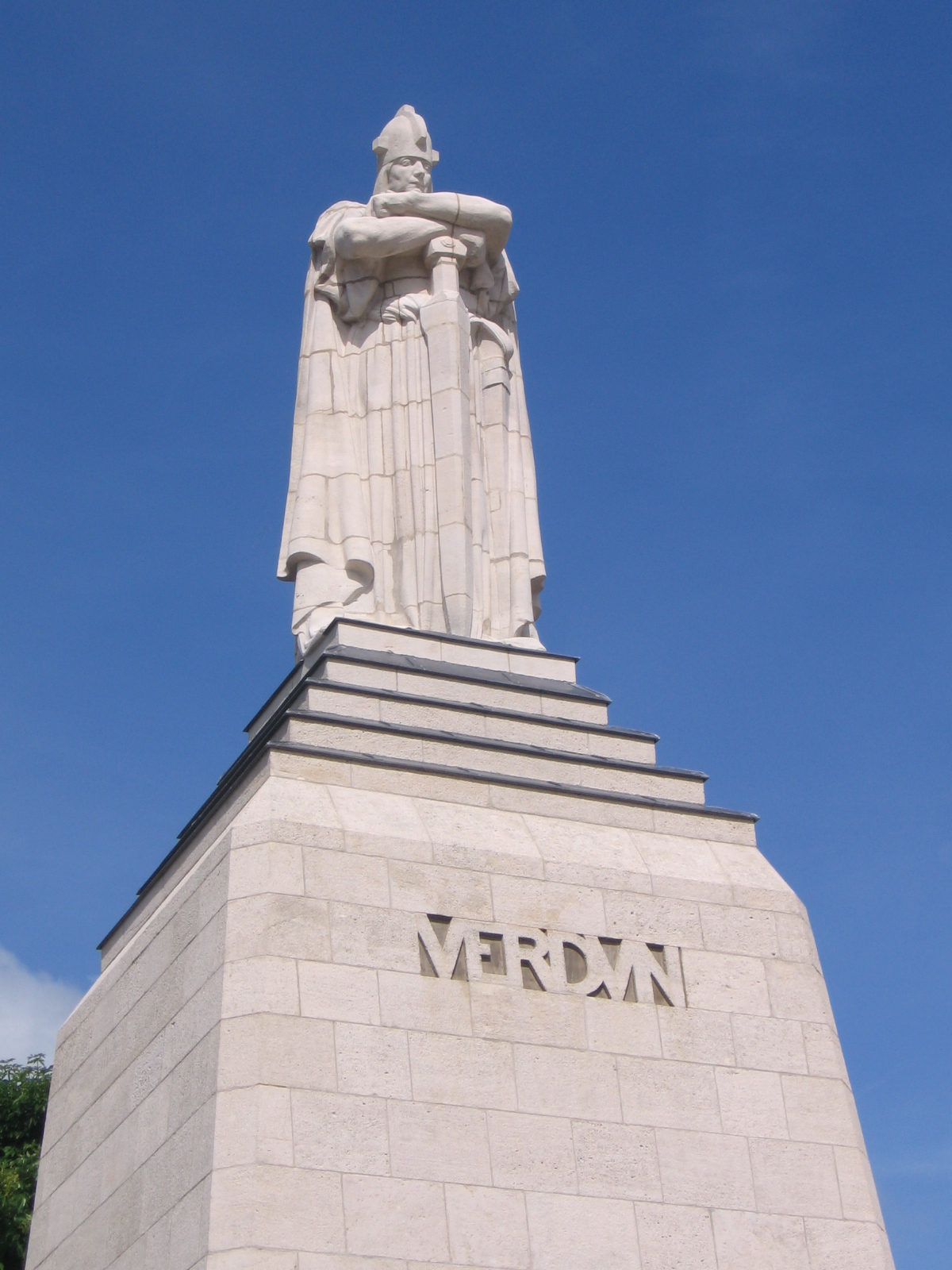
Charlemagne at the summit of Verdun's Victory Monument

A portion of the battlefield today

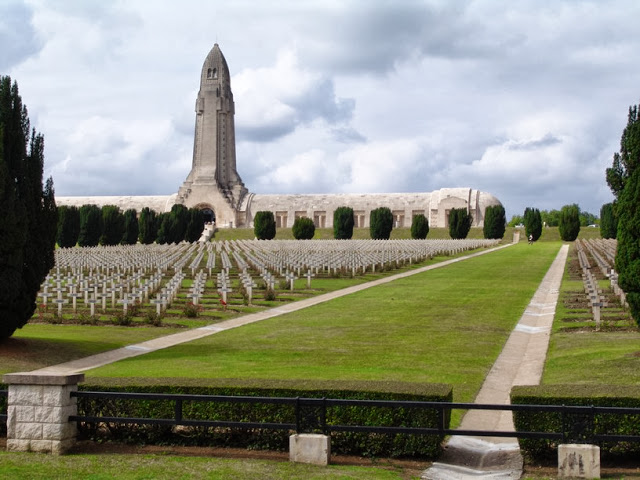
World War I memorial at Douaumont

== Landmarks ==
- The Châtel Gate is the only remaining part of the medieval city walls. It leads onto La Roche Square.
- La Citadelle was built in the 17th century. It is still in military hands but the underlying tunnels can be visited.
- Verdun Cathedral (Notre-Dame de Verdun) was consecrated in 1147 but was built on the site of an earlier church. The 12th-century Lion Door on the north side has a lavishly decorated tympanum. The whole building was heavily restored in the 18th century.
- The Episcopal Palace was built in the 18th century by Robert de Cotte and has a fine façade. Part of the building is occupied by the World Peace Centre.
- The Princerie Museum is located in the former residence of the Primicier (the highest-ranking public servant) of Verdun. It contains historic work of art from the region.
- The "Subterranean Citadel" is situated at the entrance of Verdun. It holds 4 km (2 mi) of shafts that used to accommodate soldiers during the war.
- The former Abbey of St Paul houses the palais de justice and the headquarters of the sub-prefecture of Meuse.
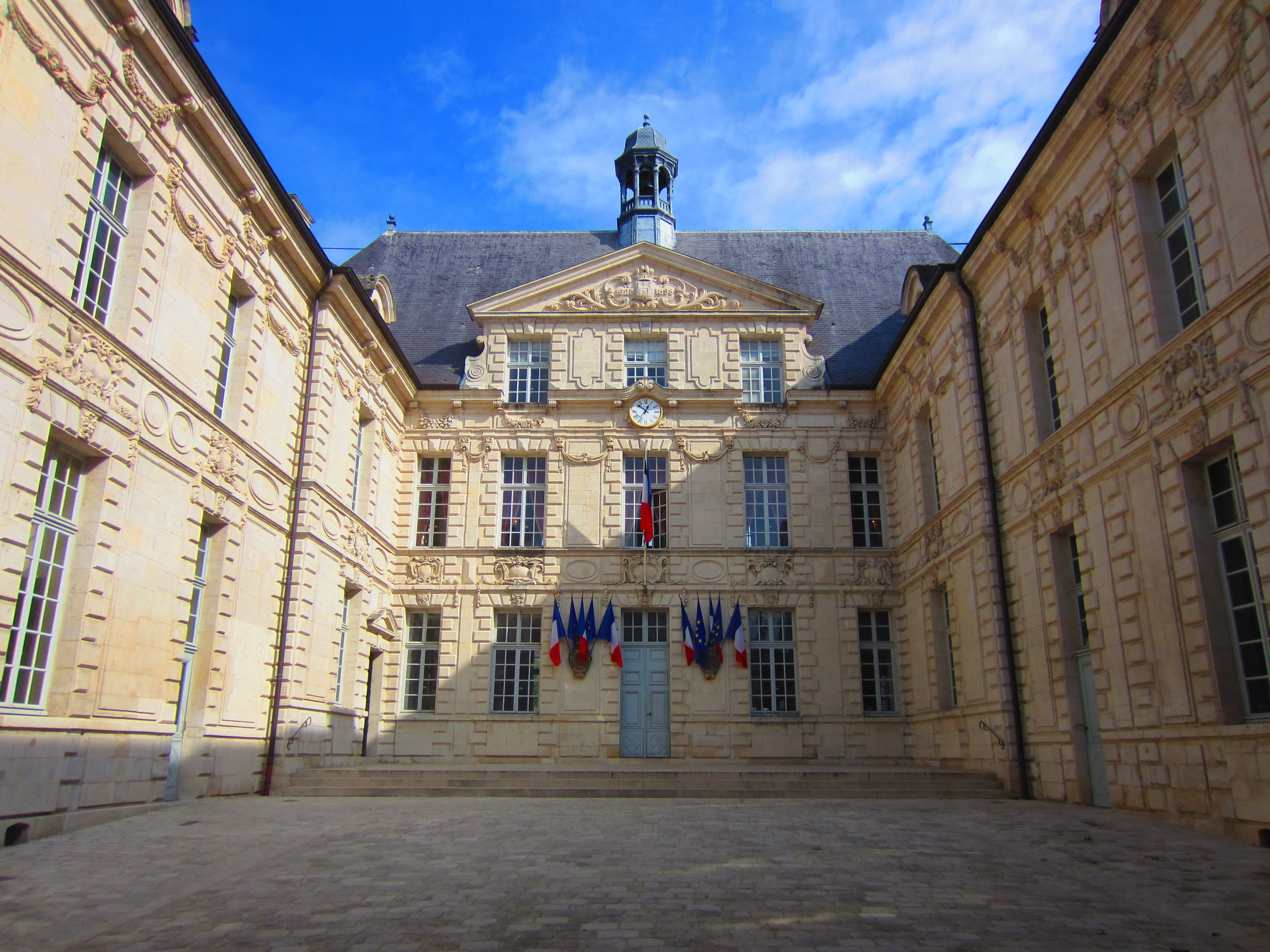
Verdun town hall

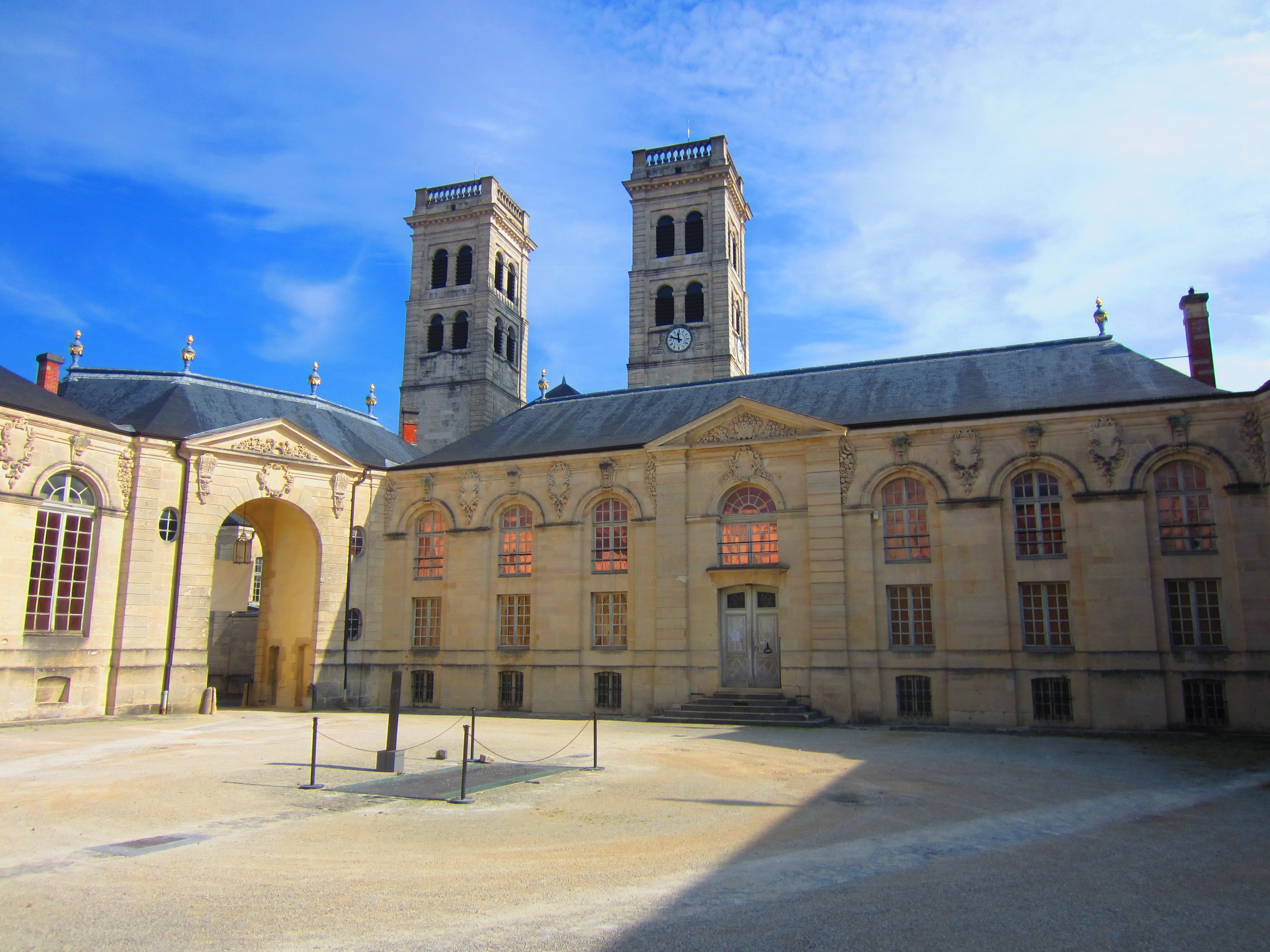
Verdun Cathedral

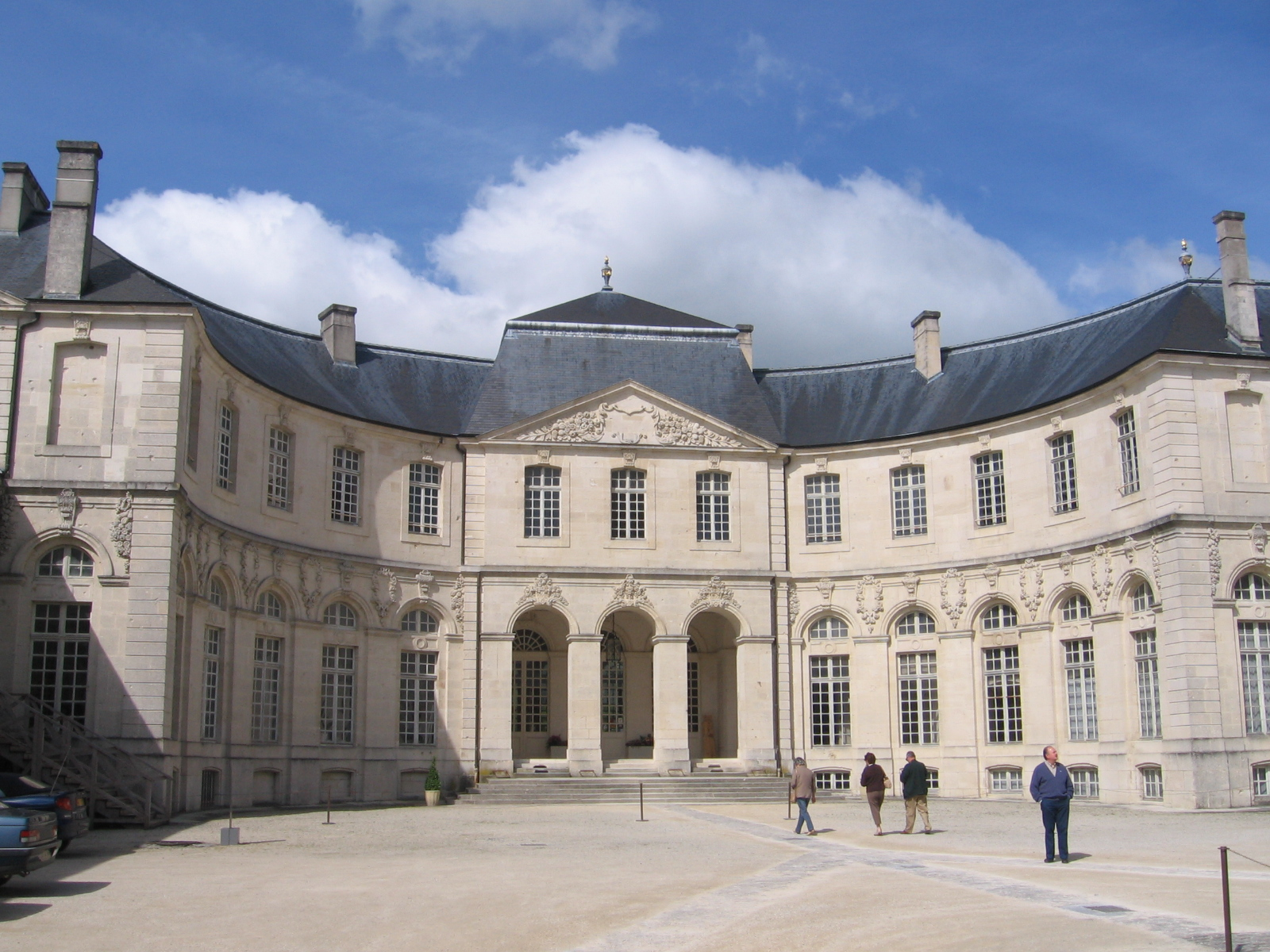
Verdun episcopal palace

== Transport ==
Verdun-Le-Rozelier Airport only supports general aviation with no commercial airline service scheduled. The nearest airports are Metz-Nancy-Lorraine Airport, located 108 km (67 mi) south east and Luxembourg Airport, located 136 km (85 mi) north east of Verdun.

== Climate ==
Climate data for Verdun (1999–2010 normals, extremes 1999–2016)
Month	Jan	Feb	Mar	Apr	May	Jun	Jul	Aug	Sep	Oct	Nov	Dec	Year
Record high °C (°F)	15.0 (59.0)	18.0 (64.4)	24.5 (76.1)	29.0 (84.2)	32.5 (90.5)	36.0 (96.8)	37.5 (99.5)	40.5 (104.9)	32.5 (90.5)	27.0 (80.6)	22.5 (72.5)	17.0 (62.6)	40.5 (104.9)
Mean daily maximum °C (°F)	5.3 (41.5)	7.6 (45.7)	11.4 (52.5)	16.3 (61.3)	20.3 (68.5)	24.2 (75.6)	25.7 (78.3)	24.9 (76.8)	20.9 (69.6)	15.8 (60.4)	9.8 (49.6)	5.6 (42.1)	15.7 (60.3)
Daily mean °C (°F)	2.3 (36.1)	3.9 (39.0)	6.6 (43.9)	10.2 (50.4)	14.3 (57.7)	17.7 (63.9)	19.3 (66.7)	18.8 (65.8)	15.2 (59.4)	11.3 (52.3)	6.6 (43.9)	2.9 (37.2)	10.8 (51.4)
Mean daily minimum °C (°F)	−0.7 (30.7)	0.2 (32.4)	1.7 (35.1)	4.1 (39.4)	8.3 (46.9)	11.2 (52.2)	13.0 (55.4)	12.7 (54.9)	9.5 (49.1)	6.8 (44.2)	3.3 (37.9)	0.2 (32.4)	5.9 (42.6)
Record low °C (°F)	−14.5 (5.9)	−15.0 (5.0)	−14.0 (6.8)	−7.5 (18.5)	−1.5 (29.3)	2.0 (35.6)	4.0 (39.2)	4.0 (39.2)	0.0 (32.0)	−5.0 (23.0)	−9.0 (15.8)	−17.5 (0.5)	−17.5 (0.5)
Average precipitation mm (inches)	82.0 (3.23)	84.0 (3.31)	82.2 (3.24)	54.7 (2.15)	73.9 (2.91)	56.4 (2.22)	77.9 (3.07)	82.3 (3.24)	63.3 (2.49)	70.6 (2.78)	78.5 (3.09)	99.3 (3.91)	905.1 (35.63)
Average precipitation days (≥ 1.0 mm)	12.6	12.5	12.6	10.8	11.6	8.7	11.2	10.9	8.5	10.2	14.0	14.3	137.7
Source: Meteociel

== Notable people ==
- Nicholas of Verdun (1130–1205), goldsmith
- Nicolas Psaume (1518–1575), prince-bishop
- Giovanni Veneroni (1642–1708), linguist
- François de Chevert (1695–1769), army general
- Henry Madin (1698–1748), composer
- Jean-Nicolas Desandrouins (1729–1792), army general
- Jean-Nicolas Pache (1746–1823), politician
- Moyse Alcan (1817–1869), poet and publisher
- Philippe Bunau-Varilla (1859–1940), engineer
- René Dufaure de Montmirail (1876-1917), football manager
- Élisabeth Brasseur (1896–1972), choral conductor
- Francine Larrimore (1898–1975), U.S. actress
- Danielle Mitterrand (1924–2011), First Lady of France
- Sophie Body-Gendrot (1942–2018), political scientist
- Hervé Revelli (b. 1946), footballer
- Mark Meadows (b. 1959), U.S. politician
- Pierre Delval (b. 1960), criminologist and forensic scientist
- Isabelle Nanty (b. 1962), actress, screen and theatre director, screenwriter

== See also ==
- Séré de Rivières system
