= The Originators (disambiguation) =

The Originators is a 2002 album by the Beatnuts.

The Originators may also refer to:

- "The Originators", a song by DJ Khaled from We the Best, 2007
- "The Originators", a song by the Jaz from To Your Soul, 1990

== See also ==
- The Originator (disambiguation)
