= Musée de la Contrefaçon =

Museum of counterfeiting in Paris, France

Coordinates: 48°52′13.6″N 2°16′37″E

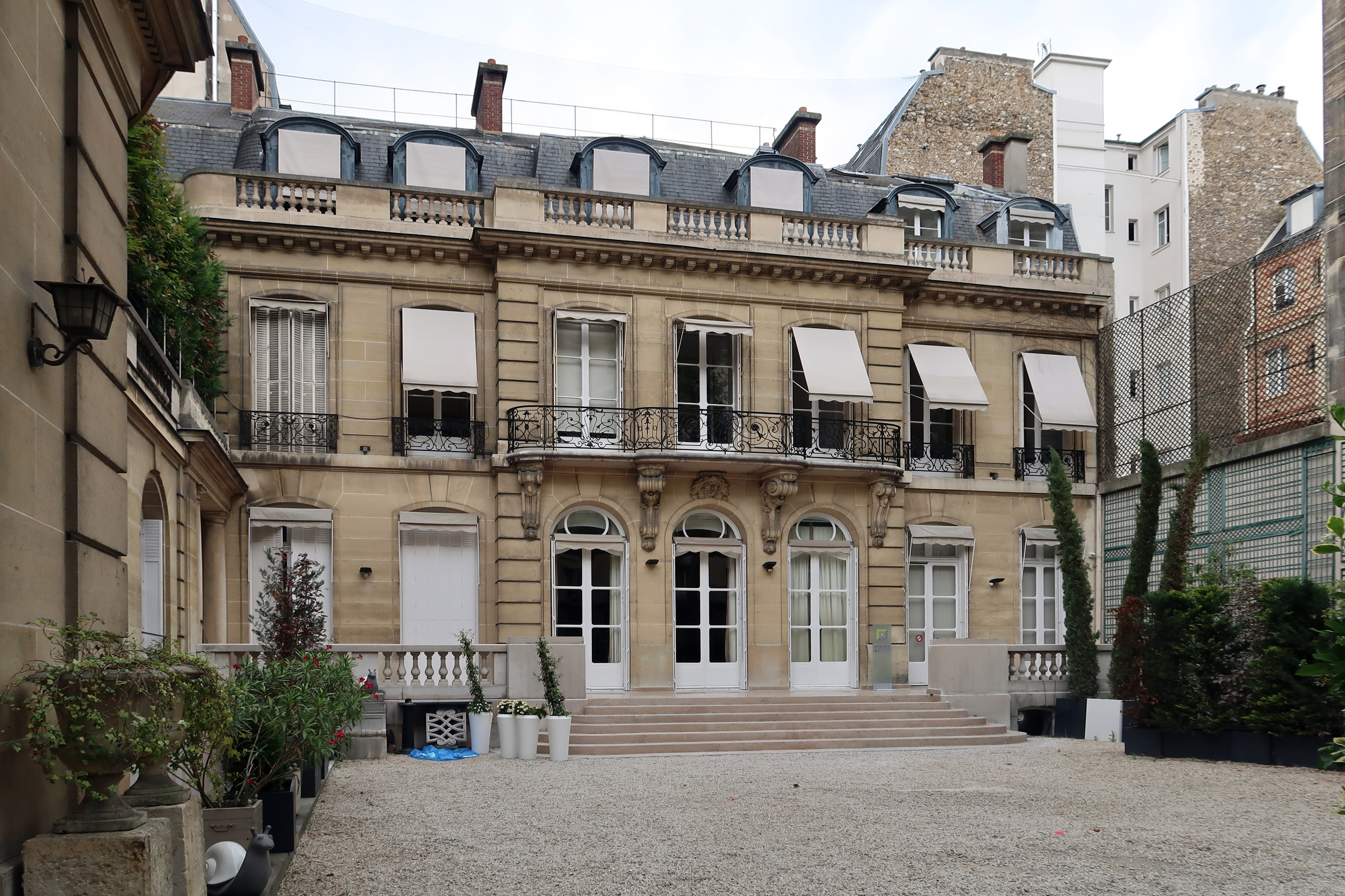
Musée de la Contrefaçon, located in the 16th arrondissement of Paris

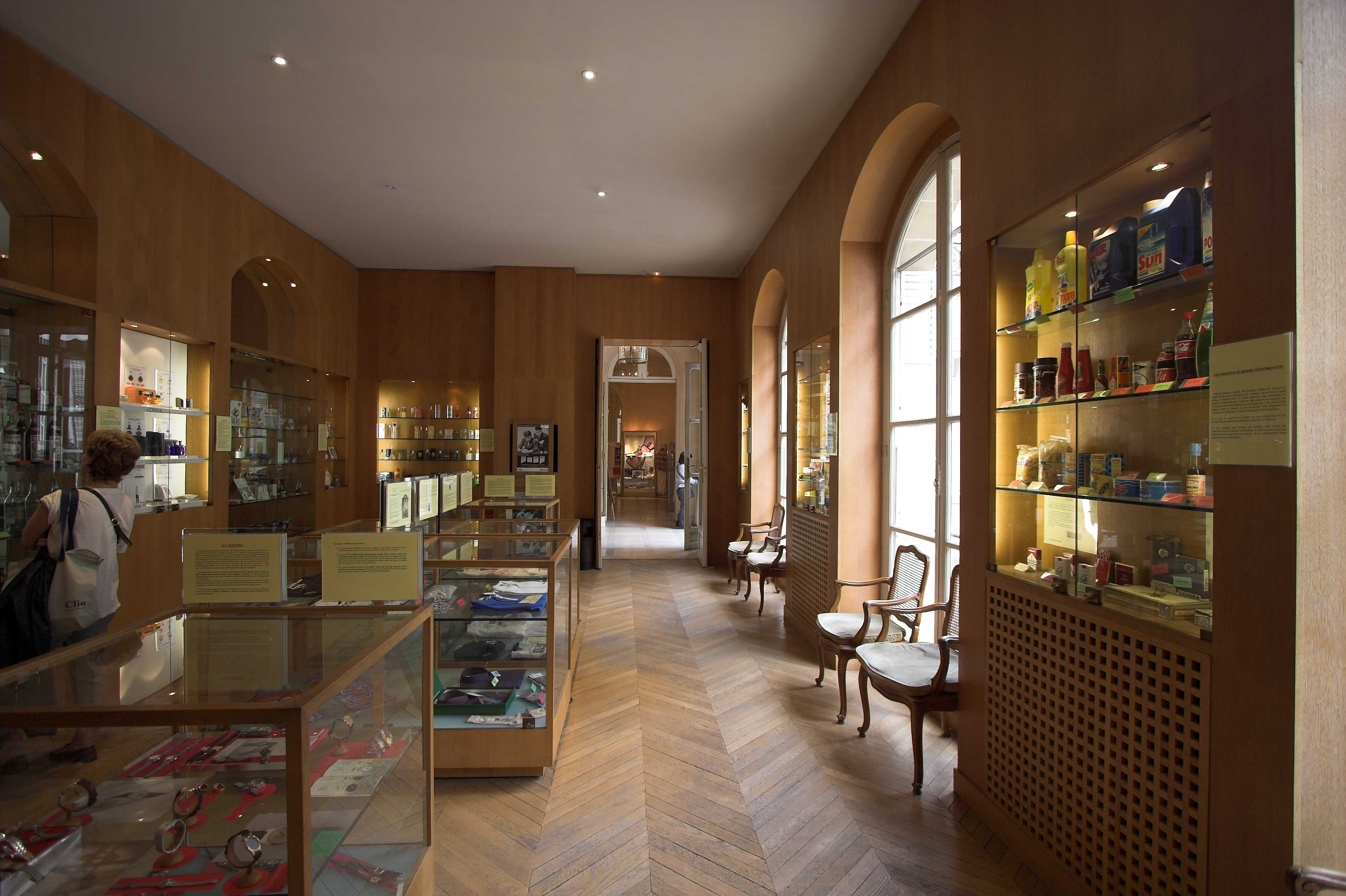
Musée de la Contrefaçon, interior

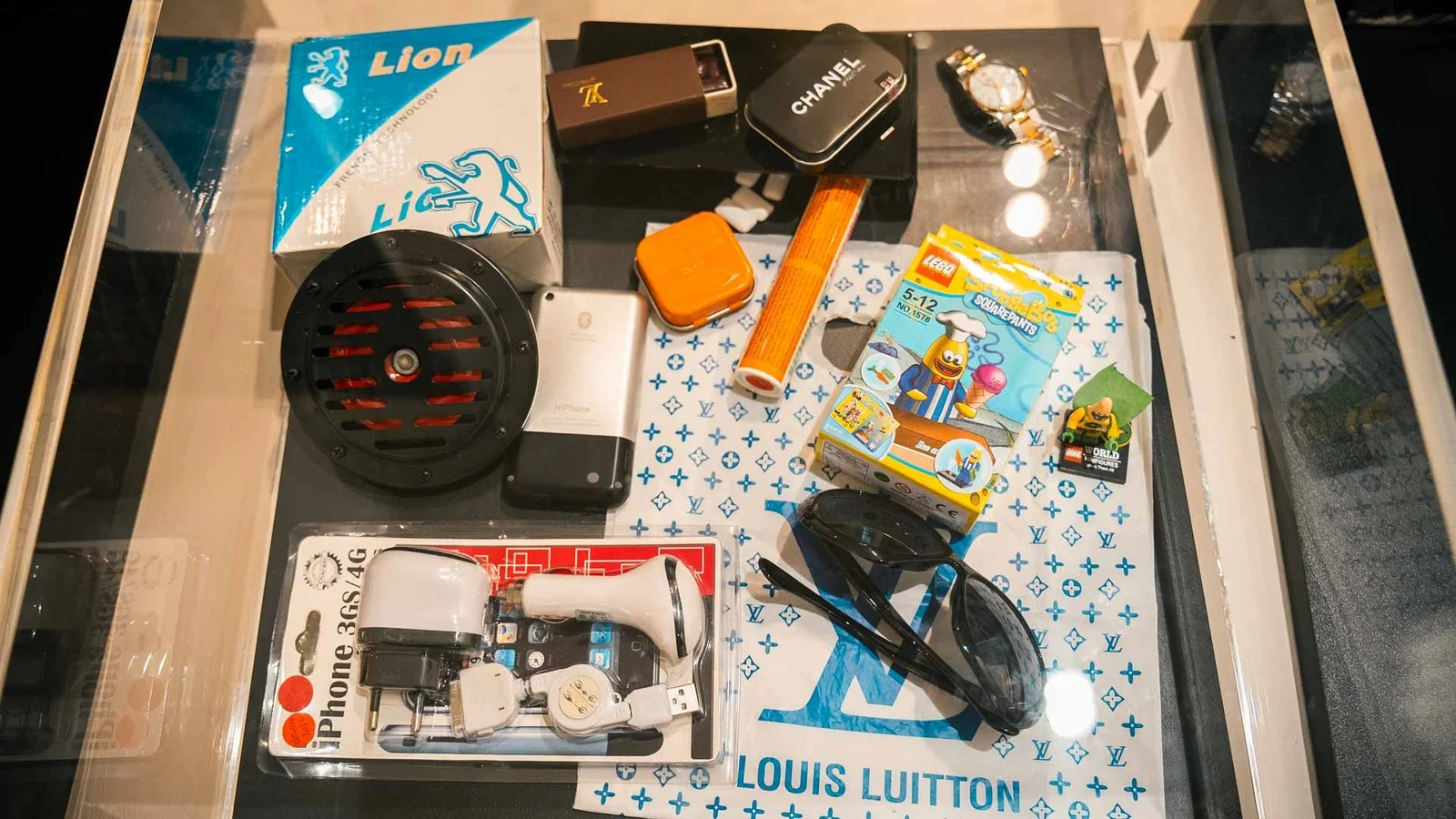
Musée de la Contrefaçon, Paris

The Musée de la Contrefaçon (French pronunciation: [myze də la kɔ̃tʁəfasɔ̃]) is a museum of counterfeiting. It is located at 16, rue de la Faisanderie, in the 16th arrondissement of Paris, France, and open daily except Monday; an admission fee is charged. The nearest métro and RER stations are Porte Dauphine and Avenue Foch.

The museum was established in 1951 by Union des Fabricants (Unifab), an organization of manufacturers. It currently exhibits more than 350 items, pairing each counterfeit with its authentic original. A wide variety of items are displayed, including toys, pens, clothes, tools, toiletries, luxury goods, etc. The monument has been registered as a historical monument since August 3, 1976.

== See also ==
- List of museums in Paris

== Links ==
- Musée de la Contrefaçon
- The Parisian Guide
