= Valentin Fabrikant =

Soviet electromagnetic radiation scientist

- Born: Valentin Aleksandrovich Fabrikant; 9 October 1907; Moscow, Russian Empire
- Died: 3 March 1991 (aged 83); Moscow, Soviet Union
- Education: Moscow State University
- Scientific career
- Fields: Electromagnetic radiation

Valentin Aleksandrovich Fabrikant (Russian: Валентин Александрович Фабрикант; 9 October 1907 – 3 March 1991) was a Soviet scientist in the field of electromagnetic radiation. He is a laureate of the Stalin Prize (1951). He claimed to be a precursor of laser and maser technology and soviet patents where granted to him, but the global community of physicists did not recognize his claim.

== Biography ==
Valentin Fabrikant was born on October 9, 1907, in Moscow to a Jewish family. His parents were Reiza Shliomovna Sverdlova and Alexander Iosifovich Fabrikant, an agronomist and professor. He was the nephew of two notable figures: Yakov Osipovich Fabrikant, an agricultural scientist, and Vladimir Osipovich Fabrikant, a Socialist Revolutionary who organized the escape of Alexander Kerensky from Russia.

In 1930 Fabrikant graduated from the Physics and Mathematics Department of Moscow University. After graduation, he moved to work at the Moscow Power Engineering Institute. In 1932, Fabrikant began working on the issue of gas-discharge optics. In 1938 he proposed a method of direct experimental proof of the existence of stimulated emission.

In 1948, he experimentally confirmed that the wave properties are inherent not only to the flow of electrons, but to each electron separately. He showed that even in the case of a weak electron beam, when each electron passes through the device independently of the others, the diffraction pattern arising during long exposure does not differ from the diffraction patterns obtained with a short exposure for electron fluxes, millions of times more intense.

He was engaged in work on the creation of fluorescent light sources. In 1951, for the development of fluorescent lamps Fabrikant in the scientific team was awarded the title of laureate of the Stalin Prize.

He formulated the principle of amplification of electromagnetic radiation during passage of media with inverse population, which is the basis of quantum electronics. He was the largest specialist in physical optics, physics of gas discharge and quantum electronics. Fabricant's works are well known both in Russia and abroad.

Andrei Sakharov mentioned Fabrikant in his Memoirs (1990). He credits Fabrikant and a coworker, Butayeva, with anticipating aspects of the development of laser and maser technology:

The chairman of the physics department at the Moscow Energetics Institute, Professor V. Fabrikant, had great misgivings about my lack of teaching experience, and he gave me various useful tips. His fate as a scientist took a dramatic turn. It was roughly during this time period [1940s] that he and his coworker Butayeva put forth the idea of the laser and the maser (which operates with microwaves instead of light), both of which make use of the effect of stimulated emission, first described in 1919 by Albert Einstein. The joy—and the fame—of realizing this remarkable idea went to others, however; some have said that this was due in part to the difficulties experienced by many Jews during those years of struggle against "cosmopolitanism", but I have no direct knowledge of this. Conditions at the university that militated against serious scientific work may have played a role: teaching overload, administrative work, a shortage of funds, poor equipment. Twenty years later I was on the committee that awarded Fabrikant the Vavilov Prize. One can only wonder whether that belated prize was any consolation to this man, then already old and ill, who had been at the very heart of one of the most astounding discoveries of our time.

Fabrikant was awarded two Orders of the Red Banner of Labour and two Orders of the Badge of Honor.

== Literature ==
- "How did the concept of acceleration develop in the Galilean mechanics?" 161 (2) 193-194 (1991)
- "On the General Course of Physics" 134 175-177 (1981)
- "Electron and ion collision processes" 50 643-645 (1953)
- "Ultraviolet radiation and its application" 46 134-136 (1952)
