= Sara Irina Fabrikant =

Swiss geographer and geographical information scientist

- Born: 27 September 1967 (age 59); Zurich, Switzerland
- Education: University of Zurich; University of Colorado Boulder
- Occupations: geographer, geographical information scientist
- Employer: University of Zurich
- Organization: Swiss Science Council

Sara Irina Fabrikant (born 27 September 1967), is a Swiss geographer and geographical information scientist. She is member of the Swiss Science Council since 2016.

== Private life ==
Fabrikant was born in Zurich, Switzerland on September 27, 1967, where she lives with her partner.

== Career ==
In 1996, Fabrikant graduated from the University of Zurich in geography, history and cartography. During her undergraduate studies she spent an academic year at the University of Canterbury, studying geographic information science, and was awarded with the Rotary International Scholarship. Her PhD, which she gained in 2000 from the University of Colorado Boulder, was also in the field of geographic information science. In 2000, Fabrikant joined the University of California, Santa Barbara, as an Assistant Professor in Geographical Information Sciences. After her return to Zurich in 2005, Fabrikant was appointed associate professor at the Geography Department of the University of Zurich. She has also headed the research group Geographical Information Visualization and Analysis at the university since 2005. From 2014 to 2016 she was head of the Department of Geography at the University of Zurich.

Apart from Geographical Information Visualization, she has mainly contributed to the academic fields of Geovisual Analysis, Spatial Cognition, Graphical Design of Application Interfaces, and Dynamic Cartography. Fabrikant and her research team have contributed to a deeper understanding of how the use of digital navigation systems influences the human sense of orientation.

Fabrikant served as vice president of the International Cartographic Association in 2015 and received the Michael Breheny Prize together with her former PhD student Marco Salvini for their paper "Spatialization of user-generated content to uncover the multirelational world city network".

She has been a member of the Swiss Science Council since 2016.
