= Janika Fabrikant =

French-Swiss painter (born 1934)

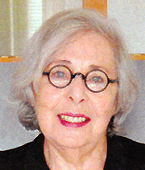
- Born: 1934 (age 91–92); Paris, France
- Website: Galerie Alex Schlesinger

Janika Fabrikant (born 1934) is a French-Swiss painter of urban and industrial landscapes, who was born in Paris, France. She lives in Zürich, where her painting is prominent because of its special characteristic of cognitive dissonance. Her style, based on Surrealism, expresses a marked discrepancy between visual reality and terror.

== Career ==
From 1953 to 1955 Fabrikant studied painting at the Académie de la Grande Chaumière. In 1961 she moved to Zurich, where she enrolled at the Zurich University of the Arts and studied painting from 1982 to 1985.

Her artistic development was inspired by visits to the U.S.A. where she felt a closer affinity to the contemporary art movements compared to Picasso and the Parisian avant garde, with which she had grown up. She was strongly influenced by Edward Hopper and Milton Avery. In Detroit Fabrikant discovered her theme which she rendered in her characteristic synthetic colours, removed from nature. In 2013, one of her installations, The Butterfly, was selected as a finalist in the Waste•smART creative competition, run by the European Environment Agency.

== Style ==
To reach out to Fabrikant's visual language some critics have attempted to categorize her style as "Visionary Precisionism" or "Expressive Objectivity" But her work is more complex. Although her paintings certainly have an element of American Precisionism, her irony, her sense of paradox, the monumentalization of the banal shows Fabrikant's roots in Pop art.

Since 1987 Fabrikant has participated in group exhibitions in Switzerland, France, the US and one in China. Her work was selected to be showcased at the Exhibition 93, Union des Femmes peintres, sculpteurs, graveurs, decorateurs UFPS "Les Contemporaines" at the Grand Palais, in Paris (1993), and she was profiled by World's Women On-Line. Her work was presented at the Fourth United Nations' World Conference on Women in Beijing, China (1995), organized by artist Muriel Magenta at Arizona State University, Tempe, U.S.A. One of her paintings was selected for the electronic Space Art archive stored at the MIR Space Station, as a result of her participation in the Ars ad Astra Exhibit, organized by the OURS Foundation.

Fabrikant's first solo exhibition was held in 1987. In total she has had 12 solo exhibitions, mainly in Paris and Zurich. Her work is not only in private collections, but several paintings were acquired by the Bollag Galleries. Since 2010 she has been represented by the Galerie Alex Schlesinger in Zurich.
