= Originator (novel) =

1999 novel by Claire Carmichael

Originator is a pair of young adult dystopian novels by Claire Carmichael that was published between 1998 and 1999. The first book, Originator, was published on September 1, 1998 by Random House. The second, Fabricant, was released the following year on October 1.

== Synopsis ==
The series follows Adam and Callie, two teenagers growing up in a dystopian society where various plagues have killed off a large portion of humanity. The resulting chaos stemming from the apocalyptic plagues have prompted the survivors to rank everyone in one of three categories: Leet, Mid, or Sub. Adam and Callie are part of the upper tier, the Leets, and live a relatively easy lifestyle that is threatened when their father Professor Richard Stillman is implicated with the crime of human cloning and eugenics.

== Reception ==
AudioFile praised Francis Greenslade's narration of both books, as they felt that he added to the work as a whole.
