= Giovanni Veneroni =

Giovanni Veneroni (1642–1708) was a linguist, lexicographer and grammarian.

== Biography ==
It is believed that he was a native from Verdun (Meuse) and later Italianized his name. He went to Paris, where he pretended to be from Florence, had a great success as teacher of Italian and became secretary and interpreter of the King.

He published an Italian-French dictionary with the title Dictionnaire italien et françois (1681), and a Grammaire italienne (1710), which were long time considered classical reference works and were re-printed on several occasions.
