= Union des Fabricants =

Unifab
- Founded: 23 August 1872
- Type: Trade association
- Purpose: Action against counterfeiting
- Location: 16 rue de la Faisanderie 75116 Paris, France
- Key people: C. Peugeot, chairman
- Website: www.unifab.com

Union des Fabricants (French pronunciation: [ynjɔ̃ de fabʁikɑ̃], abbr. Unifab) is a trade association composed of large companies against counterfeiting. It was created by pharmaceutical manufacturers in 1872 when they realised that their products were being counterfeited in Germany and created the "Charte de l'Union des Fabricants".

Unifab took part in drawing up the Paris Convention for the Protection of Industrial Property (1883) and the Madrid Arrangement concerning international trademark registration (1891). Encouraged by these successes, it helped to draw up a large number of bilateral treaties to increase the protection of industrial property between France and Austria, Portugal, the United States, Greece, Peru, Russia, etc.

In France, it was recognised as a public interest organisation as early as 1877 and came under the system created by the Associations Act in 1901. It took part in the creation of the National Trade Mark and Patent Office in 1901 and recommended the creation of the first register of trademarks, which was later used as the basis for the Institut National de la Propriété Industrielle (INPI, the French Industrial Property Office).

Today, Union des Fabricants includes 300 companies and professional federations based in France from all sectors of the economy. It is an observatory of the protection of intellectual property rights, a source of information and a discussion forum.

== Activities ==
Unifab organizes commissions on industrial property protection and anti-counterfeiting practices and legislation. These commissions lead to the signing of charters, the drafting of Green Books, Codes of Good Practice, and the production of reports and studies.

It also organizes the annual European Intellectual Property Forum in Paris, which provides a forum for discussion and meetings for all intellectual property professionals, and World Anti-Counterfeiting Day, which highlights an industry particularly affected by counterfeiting. Numerous legal and technical meetings and commissions are dedicated to tackling topical issues concerning intellectual property and the fight against counterfeit products.

== Supporting the business community ==
Unifab organises special committees to develop practice and legislation in protecting industrial property and combating counterfeiting. These commissions initiate the signing of charters, the writing of "green papers" and codes of conduct, the production of dossiers, studies, etc.

It also organise, in Paris, the annual seminar providing a broad discussion forum and meeting point for all intellectual property professionals, the European Intellectual Property Forum tackles the year's major intellectual property issues. And many symposium held in partnership with various organisations deal with a range of subjects.

Its publications provide all the main news in the field of intellectual property: a quarterly newsletter, which presents the activities of Union des Fabricants, the Revue Internationale de la Propriété Industrielle et Artistique (RIPIA) which informs of the jurisprudence, the Manuel of the Union des Fabricants, practical guides, etc.

Union des Fabricants can provide its members with the contact details of all those concerned by the defence of intellectual property: industrial property consultants, lawyers specialising in intellectual property, official agencies and authorities (Customs Department, Competition Consumer Affairs and Anti-Fraud Directorate General (DGCCRF), criminal investigation departments, police forces, justice systems, foreign trade missions), various national associations for the prevention of counterfeiting, etc.

Unifab takes part in professional exhibitions by setting up stands providing information on protecting and defending companies against counterfeiting. Its activities also include meetings with professional federations and creating and monitoring anti-counterfeiting charters.

Unifab opened offices in Tokyo (1980) and in Beijing (1998). The main activities of these Offices are:

- Lobbying officials in order to improve legal provisions and enforcement
- Market monitoring
- Providing practical data on products and information on counterfeiting
- Supporting authorities requests for seizures, prosecutions and trials

=== Providing authentication services ===
Unifab represents certain Rights Holders, in order to identify presumed counterfeit products in association with the Customs department or any public authorities during the suspension for release or seizure procedures.

=== Training ===
Unifab trains public agencies (customs department, police forces, foreign trade missions, competition consumer affairs and anti-fraud directorate, justice system, etc.) to make them more aware of counterfeits and to help them recognise these products and to support public enforcement, publishing the Manual for criminals investigations

=== Lobbying and collaboration with public agencies ===
It is a member of the National Anti-Counterfeiting Committee (CNAC), collaborates with the European Commission, the INPI, the Office for Harmonization in the Internal Market (OHIM), the European Patent Office (EPO), the World Industrial Property Organisation (WIPO), the World Customs Organization (WCO), the World Trade Organization (WTO), the International Criminal Police Organization (Interpol), the European Brand Association (AIM) and professional organisations .

Unifab is also a founder member of the Global Anti-Counterfeiting Group (GACG), which brings together all the national anti-counterfeiting associations on an international level. Its aims are to be an international forum for national information and to issue joint communications to heighten the awareness of the general public across the world.

=== Increasing customer awareness ===
Unifab works to raise consumer awareness of counterfeiting and reduce the sale of counterfeit goods.

- Being in permanent contacts in connection with media
- Informing the general public of the dangers, extent and development of counterfeiting at the Museum of Counterfeiting where a large number of sectors are represented.
- Organising the French part of the World Anti-Counterfeiting Day
- Participating to miscellaneous contribution to communication campaigns

The "Musée de la Contrefaçon" (Museum of Counterfeiting) was created in 1959 and is based in the Unifab's headquarters, 16 rue de la Faisanderie, in Paris.

== Board of directors ==
- Air Liquide
- Coca-Cola
- Hoffman law firm
- Lacoste
- L’Oréal
- LVMH - Moët Hennessy Louis Vuitton
- Microsoft
- Nike
- Novartis
- Pfizer
- PSA Peugeot Citroën
- Walt Disney

== Former chairmen ==
- (1872–74) P. Gage
- (1875–79) A. Raynaud
- (1879–81) C. Christofle
- (1881–82) V. Fumouze
- (1882-82) E. Pichot
- (1882–83) L. Bertaut
- (1883–84) Jean-Edmond Laroche-Joubert
- (1884–88) Dietz-Monnin
- (1888–97) E. Dupont
- (1897-03) C. Fere
- (1903–07) M. Frings
- (1907–13) E. Gallet
- (1913–18) L. Comar
- (1918–20) L. Vaquez
- (1920–21) P. Bessand
- (1921–35) A. Bertaut
- (1935–48) Laurens-Frings
- (1948–70) G.-L. Vuitton
- (1970–79) A. Bertrand de Casanove
- (1979–80) J. Biosse Duplan
- (1980–91) J.-J. Guerlain
- (1991-02) J.-R. Chandon-Moët
- (2002-2010) M-A. Jamet
- (2010-) C.Peugeot
