= China during World War I =

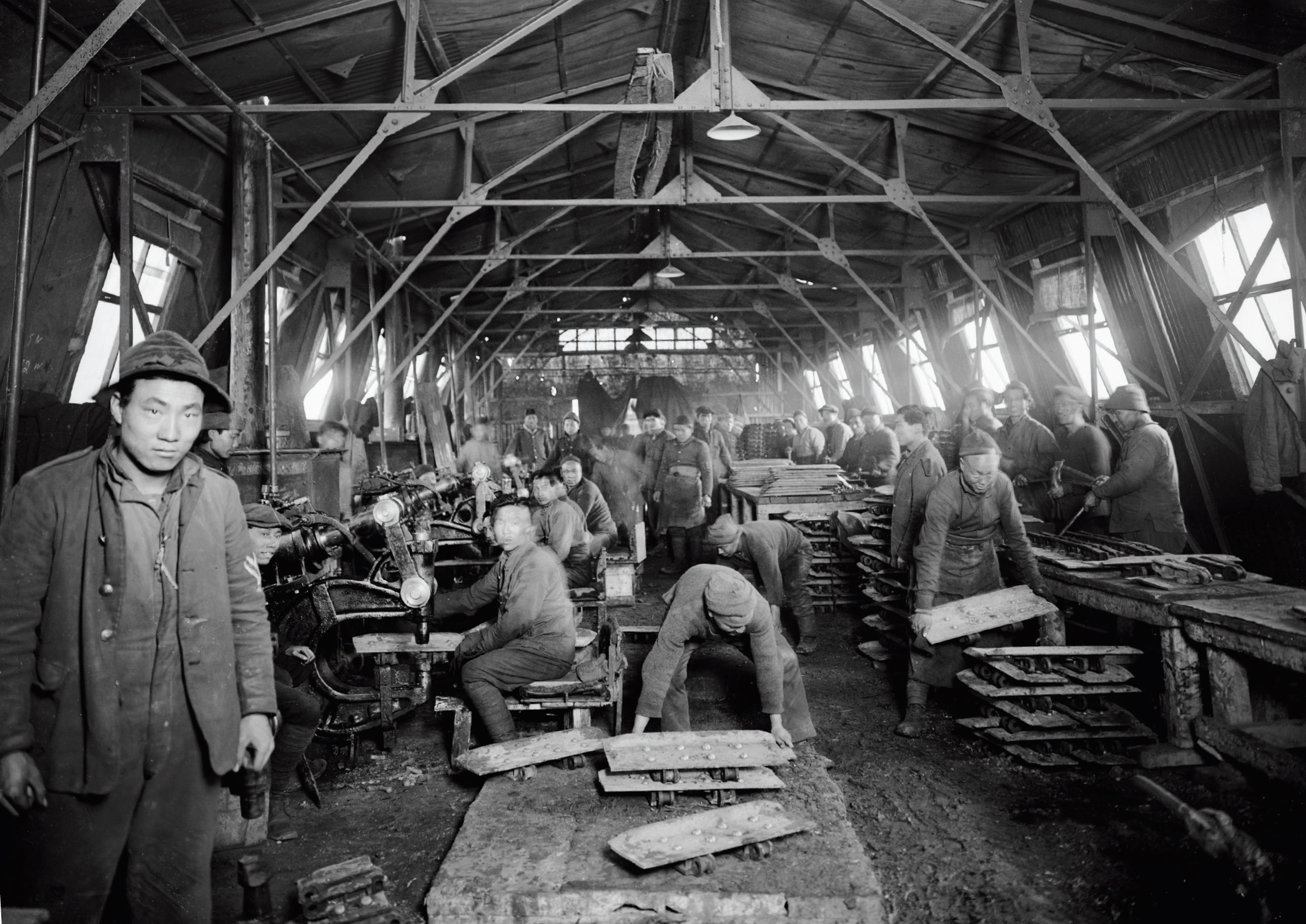
Chinese workers during WWI

China participated in World War I from 1917 to 1918 in an alliance with the Entente Powers. Although China never sent troops overseas, 140,000 Chinese labourers (as a part of the British Army, the Chinese Labour Corps) served for both British and French forces before the end of the war. While neutral since 1914, Duan Qirui, Premier of the Republic of China, spearheaded Chinese involvement in World War I. Duan wanted to integrate China with Europe and the United States by declaring on the side of the Allies against the Central Powers. On 14 August 1917, China ended its neutrality, declaring war on Germany and Austria-Hungary.

== Background ==
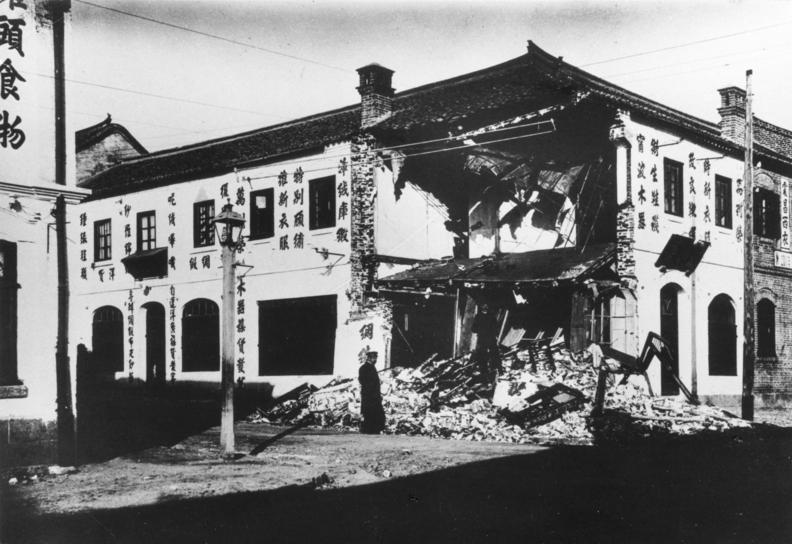
Damaged building after the Siege of Tsingtao

World War I began at the time when China entered a new period after the end of feudalism. In April 1912, the Chinese military official Yuan Shikai gained power and ended the rule of the Qing dynasty. Yuan became the president of the Republic of China while he sought to reinforce the central government.

China was neutral at the start of the war, as the country was financially chaotic, unstable politically, and militarily weak. Yuan attempted to hold China’s neutrality in the war, an idea that was favoured by the German chargé d'affaires in Peking, Adolf Georg von Maltzan. In 1914, Japanese and British military forces liquidated some of Germany's holdings in China. Yuan secretly offered British diplomat John Jordan 50,000 troops to retake the German military colony in Tsingtao, but he was refused. Japan went on to capture Tsingtao and occupy portions of Shantung Province.

In January 1915, Japan issued an ultimatum called the Twenty-One Demands to the Chinese government. They included Japanese control of former German rights, 99-year leases in southern Manchuria, an interest in steel mills, and concessions regarding railways. After China rejected Japan's initial proposal, a reduced set of "Thirteen Demands" was transmitted in May, with a two-day deadline for response. Yuan, competing with other local warlords to become the ruler of all China, was not in a position to risk war with Japan, and accepted appeasement. The final form of the treaty was signed by both parties on 25 May 1915.

== Events of 1916 ==
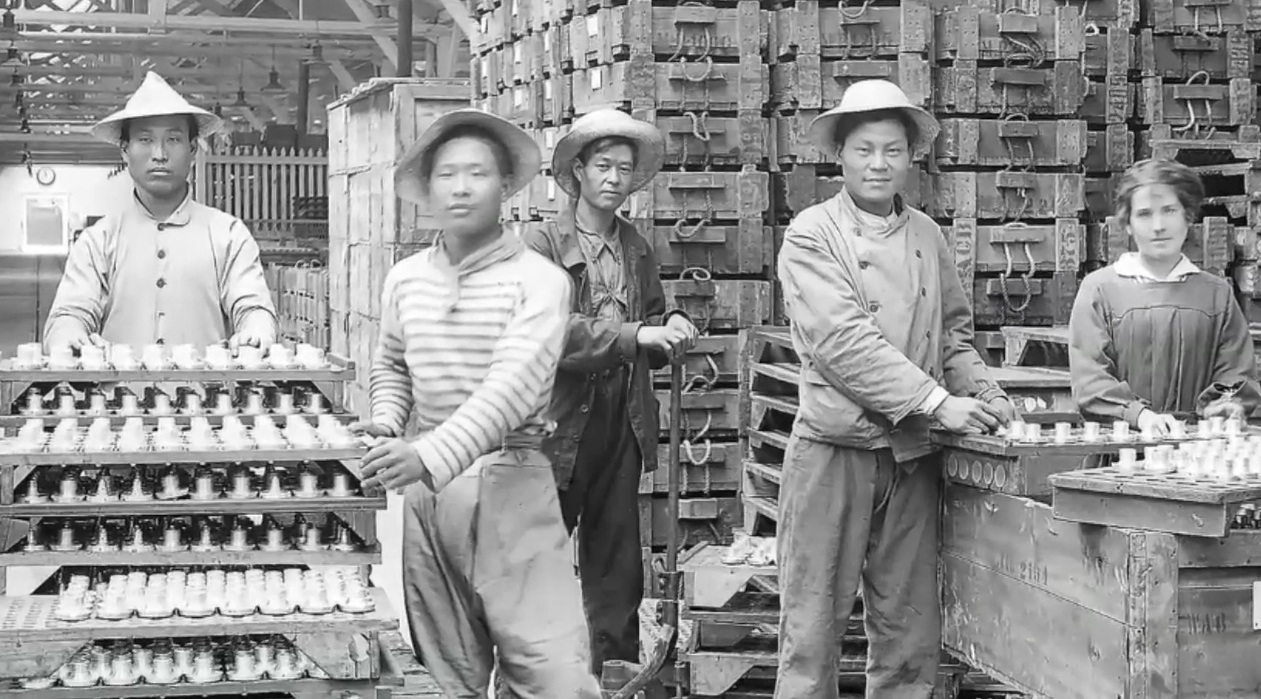
Chinese workers at a munitions factory

As China was initially not a belligerent nation, its citizens were not allowed by the Chinese government to participate in the fighting. However, in 1916, the French government began a scheme to recruit Chinese to serve as non-military personnel. A contract for China to supply 50,000 labourers was agreed upon on 14 May 1916, and the first contingent left Tianjin for Taku and Marseille in July 1916. The logistics were organized by the Huimin Company. The British government also signed an agreement with the Chinese authorities to supply labourers. The recruiting was launched by the War Committee in London in 1916, who formed the Chinese Labour Corps. A recruiting base was established in Weihaiwei (then a British colony) on 31 October 1916.

The Chinese Labour Corps comprised Chinese men who came mostly from Shantung, and to a lesser extent from Liaoning, Jilin, Jiangsu, Hubei, Hunan, Anhui and Gansu provinces. Most travelled to Europe via the Pacific and by Canada. The tens of thousands of volunteers were driven by the poverty of the region and China's political uncertainties, and also lured by the generosity of the wages offered by the British. Each volunteer received an embarkment fee of 20 yuan, followed by 10 yuan a month to be paid over to his family in China.

Workers cleared mines, repaired roads and railways, and built munitions depots. Some worked in armaments factories and in naval shipyards. At the time they were seen as cheap labour, not even allowed out of camp to fraternise locally, and dismissed as mere coolies.

== Events of 1917 ==
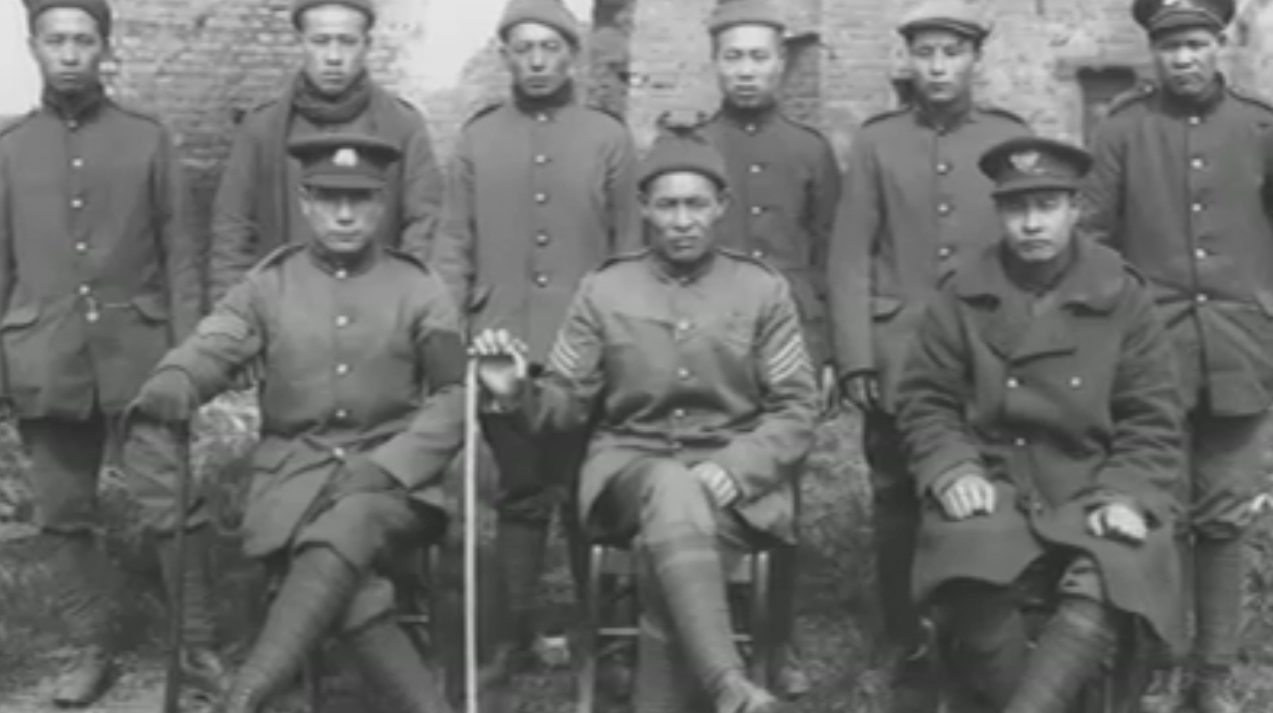
A team of Chinese translators

On 17 February 1917, the French passenger/cargo ship SS Athos was sunk by the German U-boat SM U-65. The ship carried 900 Chinese workers, 543 of whom were killed, and China subsequently severed diplomatic ties with Germany in March. The Chinese officially declared war on the Central Powers on 14 August, one month after the failed Manchu Restoration. German and Austro-Hungarian concessions in Tianjin and Hankou were swiftly occupied by China.

By entering the war, Duan Qirui, Premier of the Republic of China, hoped to gain international prestige from China's new allies. He sought the cancellation of many of the indemnities and concessions that China had been forced to sign in the past. The major aim was to earn China a place at the post-war bargaining table, to regain control over the Shantung Peninsula, and to shrink Japan's sphere of influence. China officially issued a declaration of war on 14 August 1917.

After war was declared the Labour Department of the Chinese government began officially organizing the recruitment of Chinese nationals as labourers. The government considered sending a token combat unit to the Western Front, but never did so. According to historian Stephen G. Craft, "China's war effort was minimal."

== Events of 1918 ==
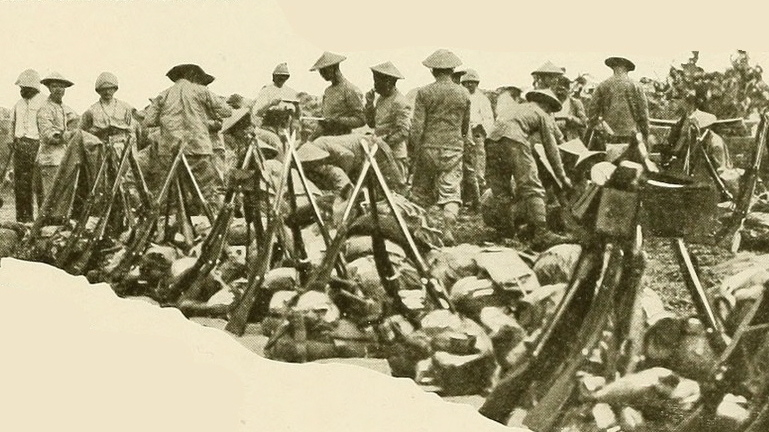
Chinese infantry on the way to Siberia

The USS Monocacy incident occurred in January 1918. It involved an attack on the American gunboat Monocacy by Chinese soldiers along the Yangtze River. The incident left one American dead. An apology was issued by the Chinese government after protests broke out in Shanghai, and $25,000 in reparations was paid to the United States. It was one of multiple incidents at the time involving armed Chinese firing on foreign vessels.

Although no Chinese troops saw combat in the theaters of World War I, 2,300 Chinese troops were sent to Vladivostok in August 1918 to protect Chinese interests during the Siberian intervention. The Chinese army fought against both Bolsheviks and Cossacks. This conflict is considered part of the Russian Civil War.

After the Armistice of 11 November 1918, most of the Chinese labourers serving abroad were shipped home.

== Aftermath ==
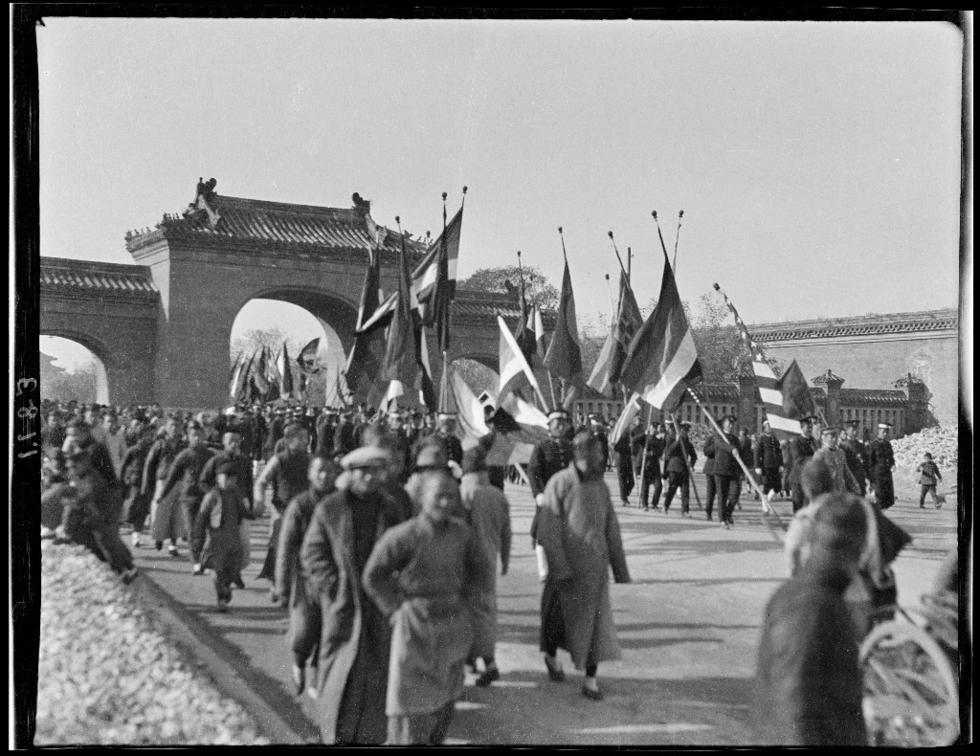
Celebration of the ending of World War I in Beijing

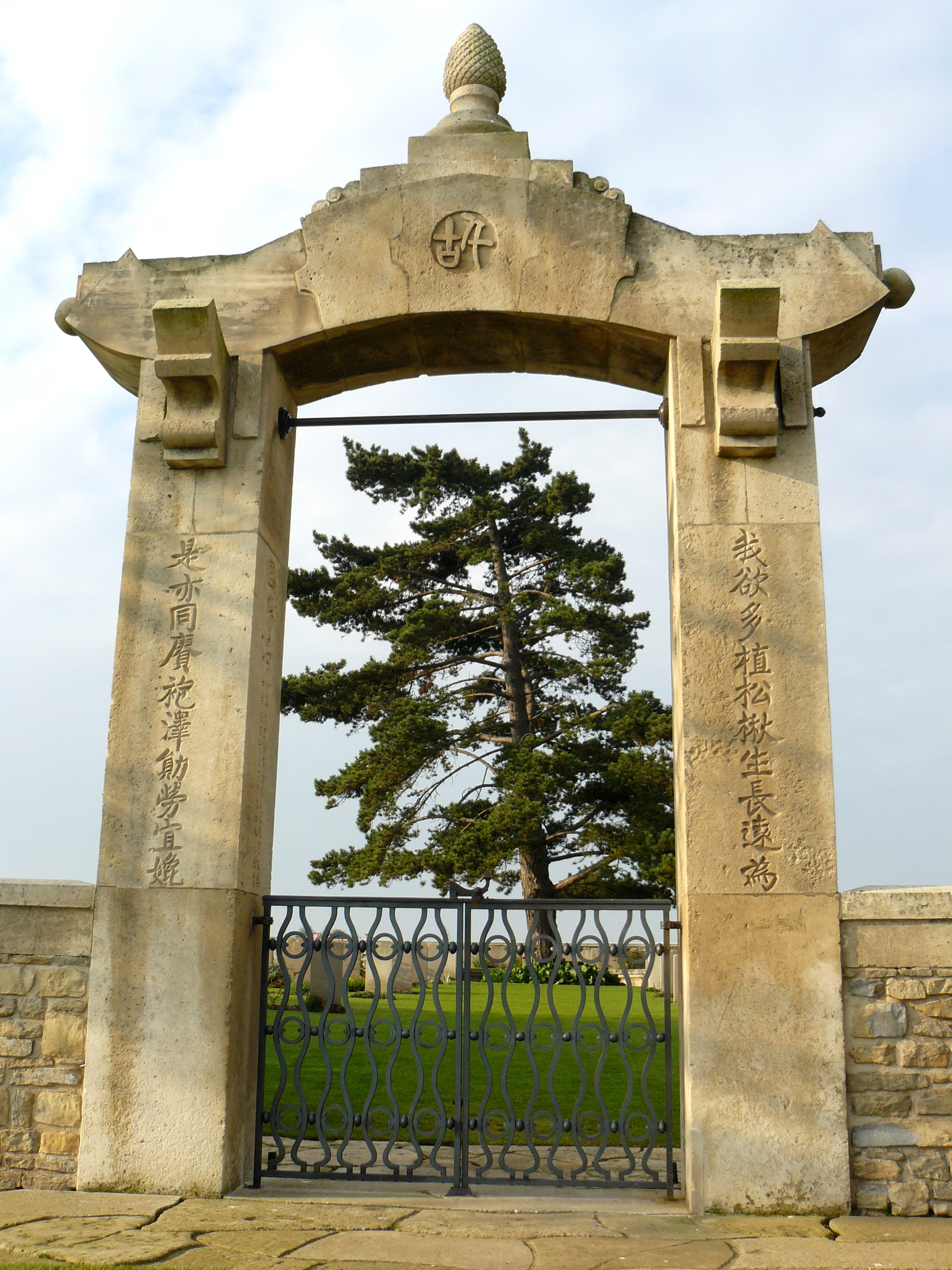
The entrance to the Chinese cemetery at Noyelles-sur-Mer

When the war ended, some Chinese labourers remained employed to clear mines, to recover the bodies of soldiers, and fill in miles of trenches. While most eventually returned to China, some remained in Europe after the 1920 collapse of the National Industrial Bank of China. About 5,000 to 7,000 stayed in France, forming the nucleus of later Chinese communities in Paris.

The number of Chinese nationals who died in the war is unknown, and estimations are controversial. European records put the number at only 2,000, while Chinese scholars estimate the number to be as high as 20,000. While most died of the Spanish flu epidemic of 1918, there were also victims of shelling, landmines, and poor treatment. Their remains are interred in dozens of European graveyards. The cemetery at Noyelles-sur-Mer, for example, contains 838 Chinese gravestones.

=== Paris Peace Conference ===
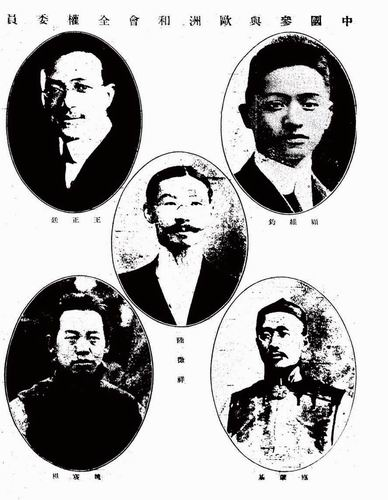
Chinese Members of Paris Peace Conference, 1919

China sent a delegation to the Paris Peace Conference. China was only given two seats, as they had not supplied any combat troops. The Chinese delegation was led by Lu Zhengxiang, who was accompanied by Wellington Koo and Tsao Ju-lin. They demanded for the Shandong Peninsula to be returned to China, and for an end to imperialist institutions such as extraterritoriality, legation guards, and foreign leaseholds. The Western powers refused these claims, and allowed Japan to retain territories in Shantung that had been surrendered by Germany after the Siege of Qingdao.

Liang Qichao led a group of private citizens to the Paris Peace Conference to lobby for China's interests and provide reports back to China. The group viewed China's goals as recovering Qingdao, restoring the other aspects of China's sovereignty that had been lost through the unequal treaties, and becoming an equal member of the community of nations. Liang hoped that the conference would bring about a peaceful foundation for world relations. Liang became disillusioned by the failure of the conference to address China's rights and the poverty that he and the group saw in Europe. The impact of the group's reports back to China were one of the contributing factors to the May Fourth Movement.

The apparent weak response of the Chinese government led to a surge in Chinese nationalism. On May 4, 1919, widespread student protests began in China, with a movement in Beijing that involved mainly young students, the general public, citizens, business people and other classes, through demonstrations, petitions, strikes and violent confrontations with the government, followed by support from students and workers in Tianjin, Shanghai, Guangzhou, Nanjing, Hangzhou, Wuhan and Jinan. This became known as the May Fourth Movement. The fundamental aim of this movement was to get the government to refuse to sign the Treaty of Versailles. Thus, the Chinese delegation at the conference was the only one not to sign the treaty at the signing ceremony.

Academic Wang Hui contends that the experience of World War I shaped Chinese thinking about China's collective future, its national identity, and its civilization. According to academic Xu Guoqi, "Chinese frustrations and defeats during [the Paris Peace Conference] did nothing to bolster their faith in Western civilization, and in fact destroyed it." Academic C.P. Fitzgerald writes that following the conference, Chinese became "completely disillusioned with the false gods of the West. They turned restlessly to some other solution."

== See also ==
- Asian and Pacific theatre of World War I
- Dengjiatun incident
- Gu Xingqing
- Hong Kong during World War I
- National Protection War
