= 1988 Guikun railway derailment =

Railway accident in China in 1988

The 1988 Guiyang-Kunming Railway train derailment accident

Details
- Date: 24 January 1988, 01:22 (UTC+8)
- Location: near Xuanwei County, Yunnan, China
- Country: China
- Line: Guikun railway
- Incident type: Train derailment
- Cause: Disputed; reported either as overspeeding or the collapse of an overhead catenary wire

Statistics
- Trains: 1
- Passengers: More than 1,000
- Deaths: 88
- Injured: 202

The 1988 Guikun railway derailment, also known as the 24 January Train No. 80 derailment, was a major railway accident that occurred in the early hours of 24 January 1988 on the Guikun railway in Yunnan, China. The train involved was an express passenger service operating from Kunming to Shanghai. The derailment occurred between Qiewu and Dengjiacun stations near Xuanwei County, resulting in 88 deaths, 62 serious injuries and 140 minor injuries. Railway traffic on the Guikun railway was suspended for 44 hours and 33 minutes following the accident.

The accident was one of the deadliest railway derailments in the history of the People's Republic of China up to that time.

Following the accident, Ding Guangen, the Minister of Railways, offered his resignation to the State Council of the People's Republic of China. He became one of the highest-ranking railway officials in the history of the People's Republic of China to step down following a major rail disaster.

== Background ==
=== Railway ===
The Guikun railway is a major railway line linking Guiyang, Guizhou, and Kunming, Yunnan. Constructed as part of China's Third Front development programme, the 639-kilometre railway was substantially completed in 1966 and entered full operation in late 1970. The line traverses the mountainous terrain of the Yunnan–Guizhou Plateau, featuring numerous bridges, tunnels, and sharp curves.

The derailment occurred on a mountainous section between Qiewu and Dengjiacun stations near the border between Yunnan and Guizhou. Operating conditions on this section were regarded as particularly challenging.

Electrification of the Guikun railway began in stages in 1980. The Guiyang–Liupanshui section entered electric operation in December 1985. Prior to the accident, overhead catenary equipment had been installed on the section where the derailment occurred; however, an official State Council investigation later found that parts of the installation had not completed the required inspection and acceptance procedures, leaving potential safety hazards.

=== Train ===
The train involved was Train No. K80, an express passenger service operating from Kunming railway station to Shanghai railway station. The train consisted of fifteen coaches hauled by a diesel locomotive.

== Accident ==
Train No. 80 departed Kunming on the evening of 23 January 1988 and was scheduled to reach Dengjiacun station in Xuanwei County shortly after 1:30 a.m. on 24 January.At approximately 1:22 a.m., while travelling between Qiewu and Dengjiacun stations, the train derailed and overturned. The locomotive and baggage car became separated from the rest of the train and continued forward for some distance. Six passenger coaches immediately behind the baggage car overturned completely, while several additional coaches left the track but remained upright. Only the final coach remained largely undamaged.

According to station personnel at Dengjiacun, an unusually loud noise was heard shortly before the train arrived. A switchman observed that only the locomotive and baggage car entered the station, while the remaining fourteen coaches were missing. The locomotive crew was immediately signalled to stop.Conductor Xu Yunsen reportedly lost consciousness following the derailment. After regaining consciousness at approximately 1:35 a.m., he ran to Dengjiacun station and reported the accident, becoming the first person to raise the alarm.

=== Rescue operations ===
Following the derailment, Acting Premier Li Peng instructed central government agencies and local authorities to organize emergency rescue operations and requested assistance from the People's Liberation Army.The State Council established a rescue leadership group headed by Minister of Railways Ding Guangen, Yunnan Governor He Zhiqiang, and Chengdu Military Region deputy commander Ma Bingchen.Initial rescue efforts were carried out by train staff, railway workers from Dengjiacun station, passengers, and soldiers travelling aboard the train.

The first military units to arrive were members of the People's Armed Police. The Chengdu Military Region deployed helicopters for search-and-rescue missions and medical evacuation, while the Yunnan Military District sent more than one thousand troops to assist with recovery operations.Injured passengers were transported to hospitals in Liupanshui, Guiyang, and Kunming for treatment.

=== Casualties and damage ===
The derailment killed 88 people and seriously injured 62 others. An additional 140 passengers sustained minor injuries. Seven passenger coaches were written off, while several others suffered severe or moderate damage.Early reports by People's Daily and Xinhua News Agency incorrectly stated that 90 people had died and that foreign nationals were among the victims. Subsequent investigations confirmed that the death toll was 88 and that no foreign passengers were killed.Approximately 225 metres of track were damaged, including twenty rails and more than 460 sleepers. Traffic on the Guikun railway was suspended for 44 hours and 33 minutes. After emergency repairs, the line reopened on the evening of 25 January, with freight services resuming shortly after midnight on 26 January and passenger services restarting later that day under speed restrictions.

== Investigation ==
The State Council established a joint investigation team following the derailment.Investigators ruled out sabotage and natural disasters and concluded that the derailment was an accident caused by operational and technical factors.

The investigation identified two possible causes. Most members of the investigation team concluded that the train was travelling above the speed permitted for the section of track and encountered significant resistance at a critical point, resulting in derailment. A minority of investigators argued that an overhead catenary wire broke and became entangled with the locomotive or rolling stock, creating a sudden drag force that caused the rear portion of the train to leave the track at high speed.

== Aftermath ==
The severity of the accident led Minister of Railways Ding Guangen to submit his resignation to the State Council, which accepted his request.

On 12 March 1988, the Standing Committee of the National People's Congress formally removed Ding from office. During the session, members of the committee sharply criticized the performance of the railway authorities and called for major improvements in railway safety management.

The original section of the Guikun railway where the derailment occurred was gradually abandoned following the opening of the Liupanshui–Zhanyi double-track railway in 2012. Several stations on the old alignment, including Dengjiacun, were subsequently closed.
