= Zhu Guisheng =

Last surviving member of the Chinese Labour Corps

- Born: 1896
- Died: March 2002 (aged 105–106); La Rochelle, France
- Occupation: Electrician
- Known for: Last surviving member of the Chinese Labour Corps
- Awards: French Legion of Honor

Zhu Guisheng (1896 – March 2002), was a Chinese electrician and the last surviving member of the Chinese Labour Corps (CLC).

Guisheng was from the Shandong province of China when in 1916 he signed a five-year contract to join the Chinese Labour Corps, through the Huimin Company. He possibly left Qingdao in August 1916, to join the Chinese Labour Corps in France. After the war, he remained in France.

Guisheng worked with the French, serving in the French Army, in the Second World War. He married a French woman and they had two children. He worked as an electrician and had also operated cranes. In 1989, he was one of only two surviving CLC members who were awarded the French Legion of Honor in 1989.

Guisheng died at the age of 106, in La Rochelle in March 2002. Until then he had been the last surviving member of the Chinese Labour Corps.
