= Gu Xingqing =

Chinese writer

- 顾杏卿
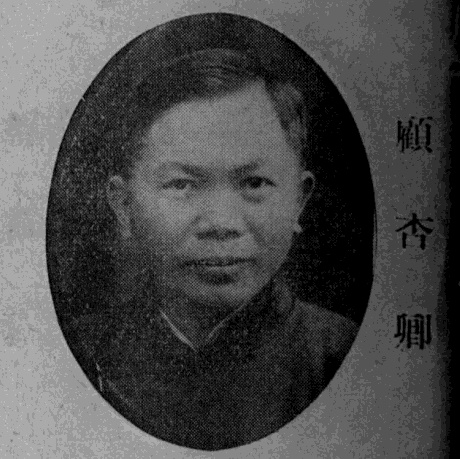
- Born: 1894 ? Zhabei, Shanghai, China
- Died: July 6, 1986 (aged 92)
- Writing career
- Period: 20th century (early Chinese Republic)
- Genre: memoirs
- Subject: World War I

Gu Xingqing (Chinese: 顧杏卿; Wade–Giles: Ku Hsing-ch'ing) was a Chinese interpreter and writer who wrote the only book-length account of World War I by a Chinese national.

== Biography ==
Gu was born in Zhabei (then part of Baoshan County), Shanghai. He was a student when the British began recruiting people for the Chinese Labour Corps in Europe in 1917-1918 (CLC). Gu signed up for as an interpreter. Like many other young graduates in China, he regarded service with the CLC as a one-off chance to travel and a springboard to further studies in the U.K. After the war Gu returned to China, and later studied at Northwestern University in the United States.

After returning to China, Gu worked at the Kailuan coal mine, Department of Finance of Jiangsu Province, and taught English. He later became a professor at the Central Politics Institute in Chongqing. After the founding the People's Republic of China in 1949, he worked as an English professor at Shanghai International Studies University and was a member of the Shanghai Research Institute of Culture and History. He was also a party member of the Revolutionary Committee of the Kuomintang (Minge).

== Memoirs ==
In 1937 the Commercial Press published Gu's memoirs Ouzhan Gongzuo Huiyilu (欧战工作回忆录, "Reminiscences on my work during the European War"). Gu's book went through two reprints (1938). It is the only book-length account on the First World War by a Chinese national known to exist.

In his memoirs Gu tells the story of his journey from his hometown in China to Europe, his work in Belgium and France and his return home. Although published nearly two decades after the events, Gu's account proves to be highly accurate in terms of dates and events. Gu's main sources were the personal notes he had taken in Europe, which were lost during the Japanese bombing of Zhabei on 28 January 1932.

Published under the Japanese occupation of China, Gu wanted his book to encourage and admonish the Chinese people. The moral lesson of Gu’s book was that “labour” in war could equally contribute to final victory as did actual battle. Gu commended the example of the Chinese labourers to his fellow-countrymen, unable to resist the Japanese by military means alone.

Gu's book was translated into Dutch — the first translation of his book — and published as a companion volume to the 2010 exhibit on the Chinese labourers during the First World War at In Flanders Fields Museum, Ypres (Belgium).
