= Wang Jungzhi =

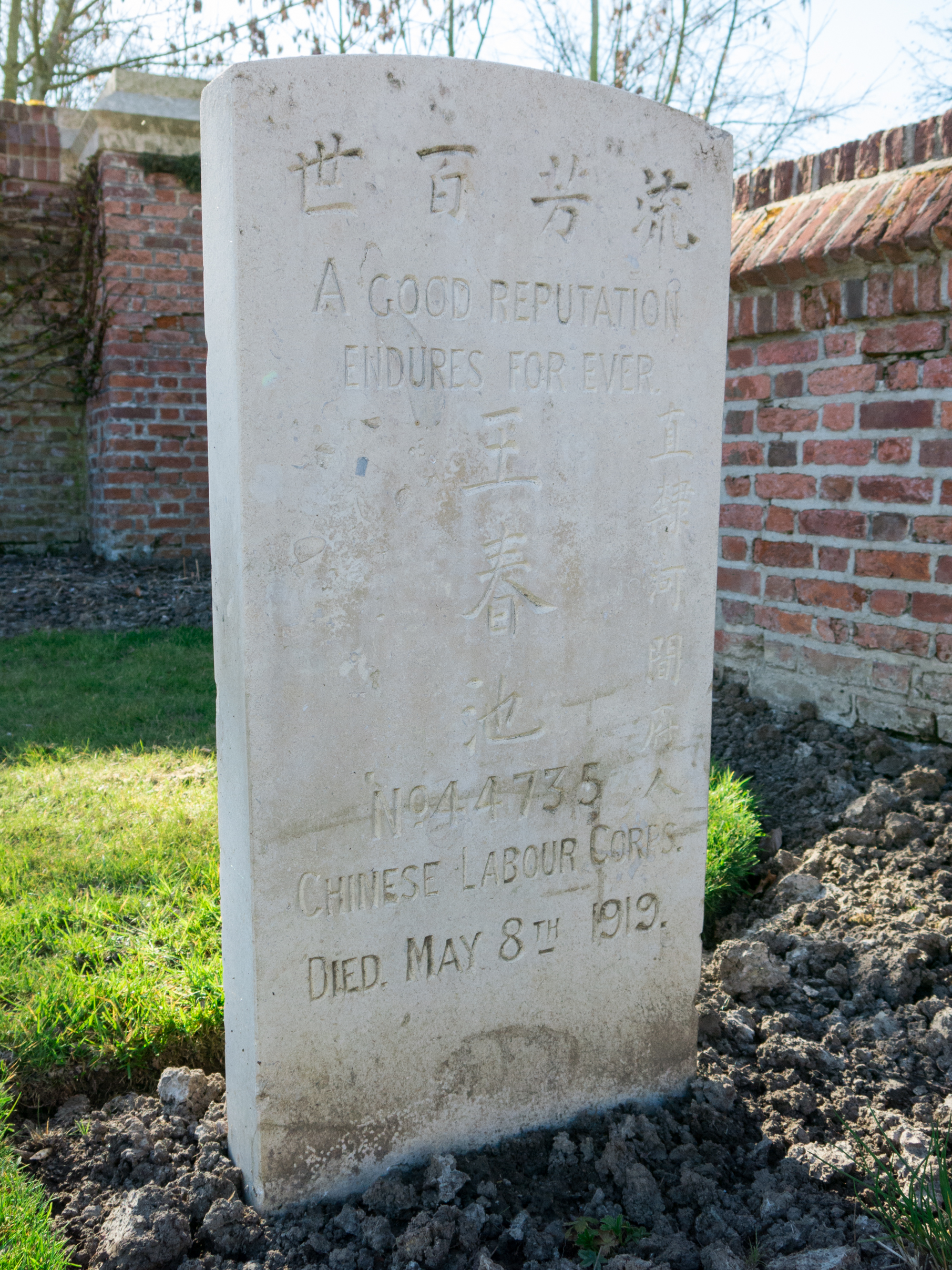
Wang Jungzhi's headstone at Poperinghe Old Military Cemetery

Wang Jungzhi (Wang Ch'un Ch'ih) was a Chinese labourer, who was one of the last people to be executed by the British Army during the First World War. He was convicted of murder and executed by firing squad on 8 May 1919, six months after the Armistice.

== Chinese labourers ==
Wang Jungzhi was a member of the 107th Chinese Labour Corps, which maintained trenches and cleared battlefields and their surrounding areas of debris and destruction. It was harrowing work because of the thousands of dead, dismembered and rotting bodies. They worked close to dangerous areas, many of which contained undetonated explosives such as dud artillery shells.

The Chinese were engaged when the Beiyang government agreed on 30 December 1916 to send 140,000 Chinese to work with the Allies. They were to be labourers rather than soldiers because China, not then part of the war, would not send men to fight. It saw sending men to work in docks and elsewhere as a commercial proposition without political intent.

== Working conditions ==
The Belgian historian Dr Patrick Loodts said: "They found themselves behind the [front lines] in living conditions they certainly hadn't imagined! They were lodged in camps which they weren't allowed to leave, subjected to military discipline, carrying out the hard work needed to maintain the immense network of trenches." They were contracted to work seven days a week, ten hours a day, for three years. Their only days off were for Chinese national holidays.

== Murder, trial and execution ==
The Chinese were repatriated only in February 1920. From the end of the war on 11 November 1918, they remained in camp at De Clijte, near Poperinge, Belgium. They drank, they gambled, they fought, they assaulted women, and they stole. Historian Brian C. Fawcett said: "Invariably gambling was rife and, on pay days, some debts could not be honoured. Fighting ensued and some killed their companions as a result, eventually paying the price by being shot at dawn." Ten members of the corps were executed for murder.

Wang Jungzhi murdered another Chinese labourer in the camp in February 1919. He fled but was caught by military police on the French coast at Le Havre, where he was trying to find a ship. The police brought him back to Poperinge, where he was tried on 19 April 1919. He was shot at 4:24 am on 8 May 1919. Records say he was executed in the courtyard of the town hall, but the researchers Piet Chielens and Julian Putkowski say it had been returned to civilian use by then.

The execution pole on display in Poperinge is said to have been used only once, for Wang Jungzhi's execution.

== Burial place ==
Wang Jungzhi is buried in plot II.O.54 in the Old Military Cemetery in Poperinge. His headstone, in English and Chinese, includes the inscription "A good reputation endures for ever."

== Bibliography ==
- James, Gregory. The Chinese Labour Corps (1916–1920) (Hong Kong, Bayview Educational, 2013) ISBN 978-988-12686-0-0.
