= New Irish Farm Commonwealth War Graves Commission Cemetery =

WWI CWGC cemetery in Ypres, Belgium

New Irish Farm Cemetery
- Commonwealth War Graves Commission
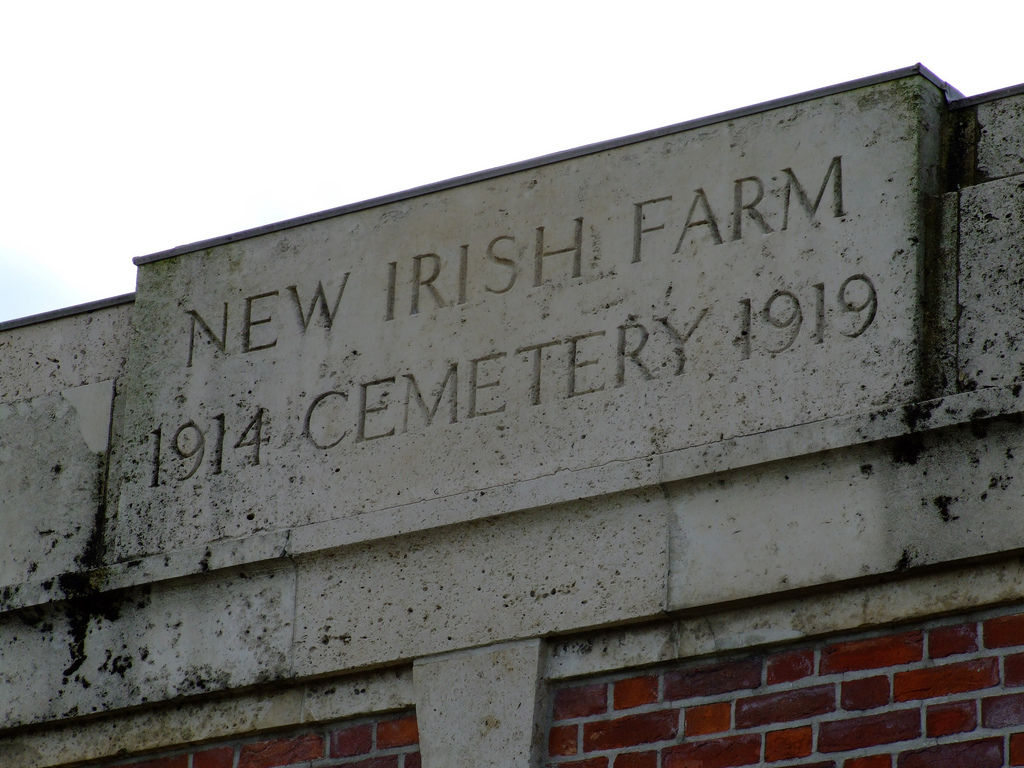
- Used for those deceased 1917–1918
- Established: August 1917
- Location: 50°52′23″N 02°53′51″E near Ypres, West Flanders, Belgium
- Designed by: Sir Reginald Blomfield
- Total burials: 4716

Burials by nation
- Allies of World War I: United Kingdom: 4356; Australia: 65; Canada: 258; New Zealand: 23; South Africa: 6; Undivided India: 7; Central Powers: Germany: 2

Burials by war
- World War I: 4716

New Irish Farm Cemetery is a Commonwealth War Graves Commission burial ground for the dead of the First World War located near Ypres (Dutch: Ieper) in Belgium on the Western Front.

The cemetery grounds were assigned to the United Kingdom in perpetuity by King Albert I of Belgium in recognition of the sacrifices made by the British Empire in the defence and liberation of Belgium during the war.

== Foundation ==
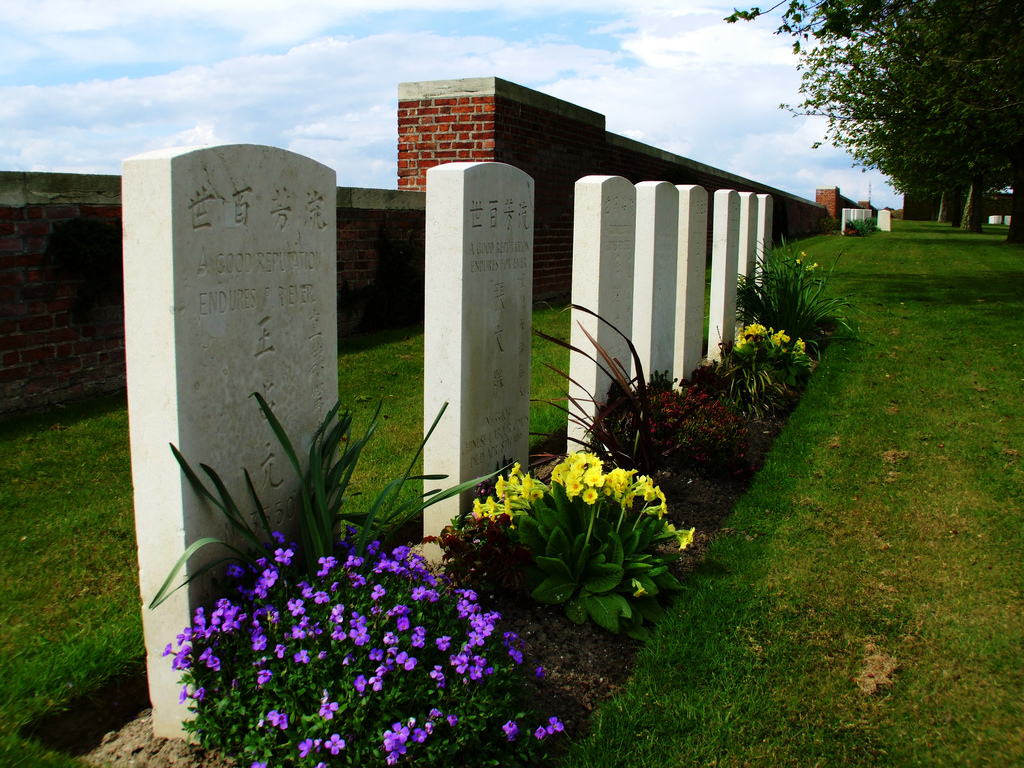
Chinese Labour Corps graves from after the end of the conflict

The cemetery, named after the nickname of a nearby farmhouse, was established in August 1917. It was used until the November, then again in April and May 1918. At the time of the armistice, it was a small cemetery with 73 graves. It was enlarged by concentrating graves from the battlefields to the north-east of Ypres and from small cemeteries.

The cemetery was designed by Sir Reginald Blomfield.

== Concentrated cemeteries ==
The following cemeteries were concentrated into New Irish Farm:

- Admiral's, Boezinge (19 soldiers)
- Canopus Trench, Langemark (12)
- Comedy Farm, Langemark (29)
- Cross Roads, Sint Jan (19)
- Ferdinand Farm, Langemark (15)
- Francois Farm, Langemark (23)
- Fusilier Farm, Boezinge (14)
- Glimpse Cottage, Boezinge (18)
- Irish Farm, Sint Jan (54)
- La Miterie German, Lomme (8)
- Manor Road, Zillebeke (19)
- Mirfield, Boezinge (16)
- Paratonniers Farm, Boezinge (13)
- Pilckem Road, Boezinge (27)
- Sint Jan Churchyard (44)
- Spree Farm, Langemark (14)
- Vanheule Farm, Langemark (22)
- Yorkshire, Sint Jan (22)
