= William Head Institution =

- Location within British Columbia
- Location: Metchosin, British Columbia, 48°20′24″N 123°32′09″W
- Status: Active
- Security class: minimum-security
- Capacity: 200
- Population: 130 (2024)
- Opened: 1959
- Former name: William Head Prison
- Managed by: Correctional Service of Canada

William Head Institution is a Canadian minimum-security federal correctional institution for men located in Metchosin, British Columbia, about 25 kilometres (16 mi) southwest of Victoria on the southernmost tip of Vancouver Island. The Institution opened in 1959 and can house 200 inmates. The institution is based on a residential design, composed of five neighborhoods of clustered duplexes; each neighborhood of four duplexes is designed to function as a community. William Head provides variety of Educations, Correctional Programs and Vocational Trainings.

== Facility characteristics ==
Federal Institution for male offenders.

Statistics as of March 2024:

- Security level: minimum security.
- Date opened: 1959.
- Number of inmates: 130.
- Average length of sentences:
  - Less than 36 months: 17 per cent of inmates.
  - 36 months and over: 28 per cent of inmates.
  - Life sentence: 55 per cent of inmates.
- Number of employees: 101.

== William Head Quarantine Station ==
William Head Quarantine Station
- Interactive map of William Head Quarantine Station

History
- Built: 1883 (closed in 1958)
- Built for: Dominion of Canada

Site notes
- Owner: Department of Interior (Canada)

Before becoming a jail, the site was used as an immigration control quarantine station from 1883 to 1958 to handle arrivals on the west coast and from 1917 to about 1918 as a training (drill) depot for the Chinese Labour Corps (CLC) during World War I. It is also final resting place for 21 members of the CLC, who died en route to or from the war in Europe. William Head was named for explorer Sir William E. Parry and was built to replace Albert Head Quarantine Station. The quarantine station was closed in 1958 and converted to use as a prison.

== See also ==
Other quarantine stations in Canada:

- Melville Island (Nova Scotia)
- Partridge Island
- Grosse Isle
- Windmill Point
