= Hong Kong during World War I =

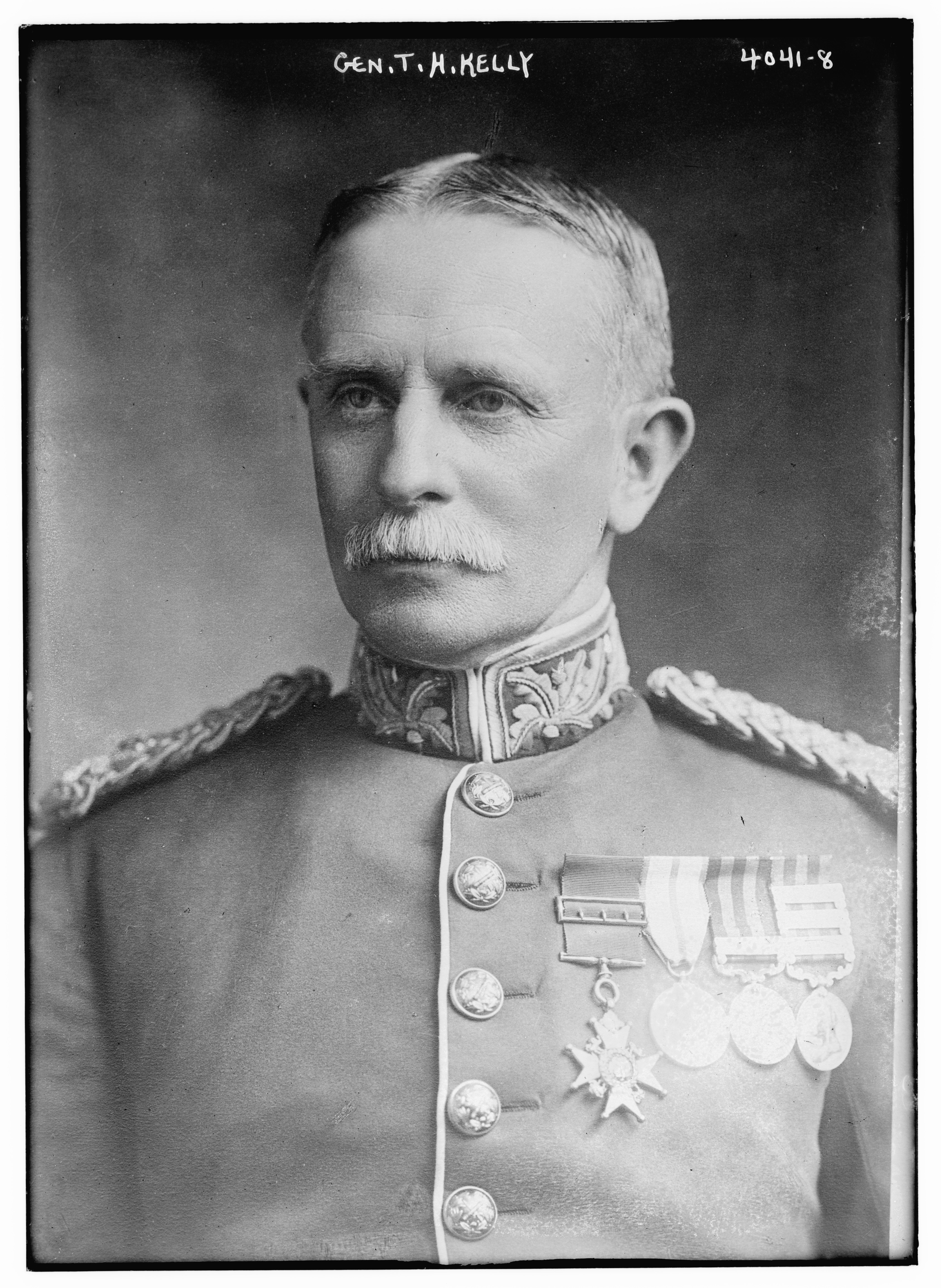
Major-General Francis Henry Kelly, Commander British Forces in Hong Kong, 1913–1915

The British colony of Hong Kong saw no military action during World War I (1914–1918). The biggest external threat to the colony was perceived to be the German East Asia Squadron, but the squadron was eliminated in December 1914. Nonetheless, the colony served as an important port in East Asia, including as the headquarters of the British China Station, and saw significant socioeconomical changes during the war.

== War contributions ==
During much of the war, Hong Kong was administrated by Governor Francis Henry May. During the early weeks of the war, 60,000 to 100,000 Chinese residents left the colony for the neighbouring province of Kwangtung, in fear that the colony might be attacked. The colonial government was given extensive emergency powers during the war, but only used the powers once in 1917 to regulate the prices of certain goods.

=== Local defences ===
At the outbreak of the war, the colony was defended by three infantry battalions (one British and two Indian) of around 4,000 men, several coastal artillery batteries, a volunteer force of around 500 men, and a small local defence flotilla consisting of several destroyers and submarines. The garrison was commanded by Commander British Forces in Hong Kong Major-General Francis Kelly. From 1917, the garrison was augmented by the Hong Kong Defence Corps. Three armed merchant cruisers, converted from merchant ships in local dockyards, protected the port and the sea lanes.

=== Enlistment ===
During the early stages of the war, enlistment for military service was low, as most British in Hong Kong at the time were professionals or businessmen. By early 1915, there were only 47 volunteers. In 1917, the colonial government introduced the Military Service Ordinance, requiring all males to serve in various capacities. This led to the formation of the Hong Kong Defence Corps. The Hong Kong Defence Corps took over garrison duties, and the regular garrison was freed for service in Europe. By the end of the war, almost a quarter (579 out of 2,157) of the British male population volunteered outside Hong Kong for military services. Chinese residents also joined the Chinese Labour Corps, serving in France and Mesopotamia.

=== Hong Kong as a port ===
Hong Kong served as a major port in East Asia during the war. From early July 1914, the China Station were ordered to concentrate in Hong Kong. As a result, at the outbreak of the war, the pre-dreadnought HMS Triumph, one British armoured cruiser, one French armoured cruiser and two light cruisers were in Victoria Harbour. While at port, HMS Triumph borrowed soldiers from one of the local garrison battalions to serve on board. On 12 August, 1914, nervous gunners of the eastern batteries of Hong Kong Island fired on the Japanese freighter Shikoku Maru (四国丸), killing one sailor. As the war went on, Hong Kong continued to resupply warships for Britain and her allies during the war and Allied intervention in the Russian Civil War. The Chinese Labour Corps were also shipped from Hong Kong to Europe and Mesopotamia.

=== Threats ===
The most significant external threat to the port city was the German East Asia Squadron, and at the outbreak of war, the garrison was extremely nervous to learn that major units of the Squadron were not in Tsingtao. However, on 23 August 1914, Japan entered the war on the side of the Entente. As the Japanese navy could easily dominate the East Asian waters, worries over a German attack on the colony lessened. In November, an Anglo-Japanese force, including HMS Triumph which had departed from Hong Kong, captured Kiautschou. In December, the main body of the East Asia Squadron was destroyed in the Battle of the Falkland Islands. By then, all concerns of a German attack had all but disappeared.

Though China would eventually join the Entente in 1917, the uncertainty of the Chinese position during the early stages of the war and the volatile situation in the nation throughout the duration of the war became a concern. In the neighbouring province of Kwangtung, various warlords and Sun Yat-sen were struggling for power. The various factions, all sharing the ideals of Chinese nationalism, along with the unstable regime were deemed as "anti-British" by the colonial government, and some in the British Army began to plan for a possible Chinese invasion. Although by the end of 1914, the Cantonese regime found itself divided over internal politics, and was no longer deemed a serious threat, the possibility of a Chinese invasion was not discounted until the later stages of the war. As a result, a temporary trench, supported by 10 machinegun posts, was established in Kowloon.

Kelly also reported that the local Indian Police, the Indian Watchmen and the Indian residents had "very strong anti-British feeling" and "a real danger", perhaps influenced by the news of the concurrent Indian independence movement and Hindu–German Conspiracy. However, while Indians in Singapore mutinied in 1915, Indians in Hong Kong remained peaceful during the war.

=== Economic contributions ===
Both the European and Chinese community supported the war effort by subscribing to war charities. Local business magnate Chau Siu-ki served on the War Charities Committee. The residents of Hong Kong donated two Royal Aircraft Factory B.E.2s, HONG KONG, No. 1 and HONG KONG, No. 2, towards the Imperial Aircraft Flotilla fundraising scheme. Wealthy individuals or organisations also made donations to the war effort, including Sir Robert Ho Tung who donated the cost of two aircraft and several ambulances to the British government. A total of $10 million Hong Kong dollars were raised on top of the normal military contribution, including 2 million raised in the last two years of the war, after property owners (mostly Chinese) agreed to an additional rate assessment of 7 percent. A government monopoly on opium, introduced in March 1914, became a major source of government income. By 1918, the profits from the monopoly accounted for 46.5 percent of total government revenue. This helped propel the Hong Kong economy into a wartime boom and also allow extra war contribution to Britain.

=== Casualties ===
At least 75 residents who were recruited for military service were killed outside Hong Kong during the war. The war also saw the deaths of 535 Hong Kong Chinese, including 384 who were part of the Chinese Labour Corps in Mesopotamia. Many had died due to disease, exposures or accidents. Furthermore, at least 100 Chinese sailors in the British Merchant Navy were killed through military action, diseases or accidents.

== Anti-German sentiment ==
In 1911, 342 Germans, out of 5,248 Westerners, lived in Hong Kong. They were the second-largest Western community after the British. The Germans generally exerted significant economic influence but little political influence. Two days before the war, on August 3, 1914, the German consul Arthur Voretzsch received a telegram from Governor May stating that if war broke out, May would continue to allow Germans to continue their business operations in the colony, as long as they are under oath that they would not seek to damage British interests. After war broke out on August 5, 1914, May expressed his feelings of the war to Voretzsh:

My dear Dr Voretzsch, I am grieved to tell you that the worst has happened and that our countries are now at war. I would give my life if I could avert such a catastrophe by so doing.

In contrast to the Governor's sentiments, Commander Kelly was wary of the German residents of the colony. On 5 October, 1914, Kelly wrote to May:

I look upon every German, man or woman, at large in the Colony, as a potential factor for evil, and possibly for prolonging the war. There is little doubt they spread rumours and not unnaturally do what they can to incite the Chinese and Indians against us... Their presence renders it necessary to take more elaborate precautions in guarding all important places. Personally, I should not be sorry to see all fit for service made prisoners of war.

A few days later the outbreak of war, the colonial government placed enemy aliens on parole. Germans were allowed to continue their business, but they had to report to the police at stated time, restricted to certain areas in the colony and were not allowed to leave Hong Kong. On 12 August, London ordered the German consulate in Hong Kong closed down, and Germans and Austrians would be represented by the then-neutral American consulate. Following a public outcry, the Prussian double-headed eagle emblem of the Deutsch-Asiatische Bank building was removed. In the meantime, it was reported in the British press that Germans had been privately celebrating the war and burning the Union Jack.

Within the first week of war, Germans were already being arrested. They were first sent to a quarantine station on Stonecutters Island. Philipp Wittmann, a worker on the German shipping freighter SS Princess Alice that arrived in Hong Kong days after the declaration of war, described the camp on the island as a "small, heavily fenced-off, barren space," one where the internees were constantly threatened by typhoons. On 12 September, the internees were moved to an unfinished camp near Hung Hom on Chatham Road. The Hung Hom camp was considered an improvement to the Stonecutters Island camp. Meanwhile, women and children were kept in a downtown hotel and were catered for by the hotel chefs and staff.

On 6 October, the Legislative Council passed a bill that allowed German firms to conduct new business, subject to certain restrictions. However, in the same month, London had pressured the colonial government to pass the "Trading with the Enemy Ordinance", which allowed the government to prevent, detect, and punish any acts of trade between residents and the enemy, and to wind up the assets of enemy banks. Using the ordinance as a legal basis, all German firms were liquidated and many German properties were confiscated. In the last week of October, after Germany issued a call-up of their military reserves, an order for internment was issued in Hong Kong. On 31 October, all Germans in Hong Kong on the reserve list were to be interned. German women, children, and those above military age were made to leave the colony for the Shanghai International Settlement or Manila.

German nationals from the Kiautschou Bay concession were also transferred to the camp after the concession was captured by the Entente in November 1914. The internees were allowed to celebrate Christmas, and a masked ball was held for New Year's Eve. On 27 January, Emperor Wilhelm II's birthday was celebrated by the internees in secrecy. On the next day, food rationings were cut short after London learnt of the treatment of British soldiers in German camps. The prisoners complained they were treated like coolies, and Germany complained about the conditions of the camp to the United States, who sent Consul-General George E. Anderson in February 1915 to inspect the camp. Following an escorted inspection, he found the camp to be satisfactory. On 17 February 1915, when five internees were given tools to build an earthen stage for a theatre hut. With the tools, they dug a 180-foot (55 m) tunnel and attempted to escaped. One internee was shot by a sentry and captured, and another was found in the hills of the New Territories. The remaining three were caught attempting to cross into China near Sai Kung. In another subsequent incident on 21 May, 1915, an internee attempted to escape when he was allowed to go to the toilet during a visit to the dentist. He was caught in the same night. Typhoons continued to be a threat. In one occasion, on 30 October, 1915, the internees had to be temporarily evacuated to the Gun Club Hill Barracks.

In January 1916, all the internees were transferred aboard SS Empire to another internment camp in Holsworthy, Australia. When the war was over, they were deported to Germany and their properties were never returned.

In total, the Stonecutters Island camp held 226 prisoners. After the transfer to the Hung Hom camp, the prisoner population was "around 200." In 1916, more than 300 internees, including 7 women and 13 children, were sent to Australia. Famous internees included local entrepreneur Jacob Jebsen.

== Aftermath ==
Despite the exodus of Hong Kong residents in 1914 and a decrease of the Western population from 20,710 to 13,600 between 1914 and 1919, the population of Hong Kong as a whole grew rapidly during the war, from 501,304 (1914) to 598,100 (1919).

After formal conclusion of the war in July 1919, Hong Kong celebrated with fireworks, motorcades and parades. Despite the celebrations, severe inflation gripped the colony. The inflation was caused by wartime shortages and a rise in the local population. A week after the celebrations, following news of crops failure in Thailand, along with the restrictions of exports in Indochina and India and a surge in demand in Japan, a major rice riot broke out. The riots were quelled after the distribution of free meals to local, the importation of rice from Indochina and the purchase of rice stock by the government.

As Europeans left the colony to serve in the military, Chinese businessmen were able to move into businesses traditionally dominated by Europeans, such as banking and shipping. Three major Chinese banks, including the Bank of East Asia, were founded between 1914 and 1919. In turn, British and Entente businessmen displaced their German rivals. Because of the deportation of Germans, there were only 3 Germans in Hong Kong in 1921.
