= Republic of China declaration of war on Germany =

1917 declaration of war against Germany and Austria-Hungary

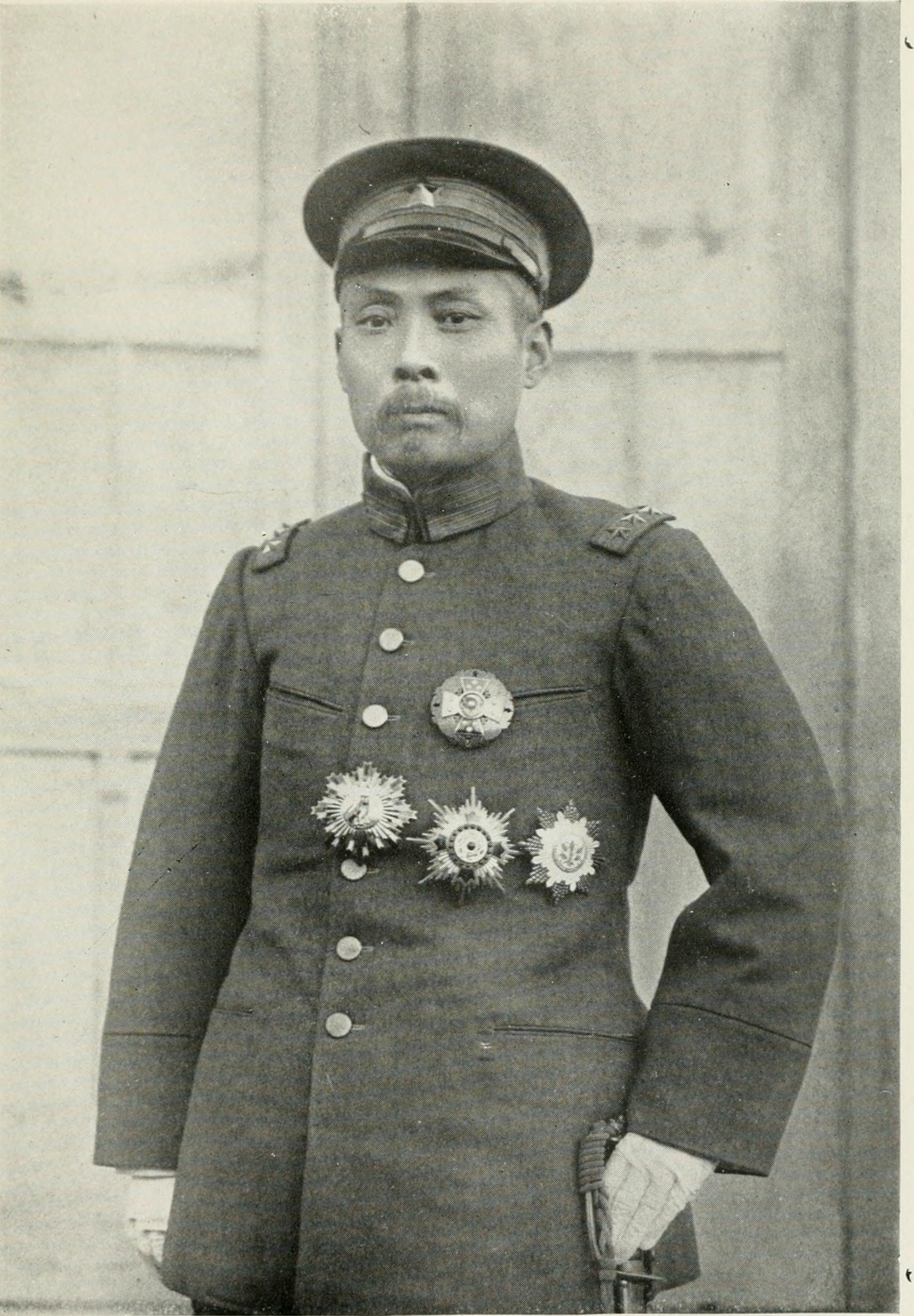
The declaration of war on German and Austro-Hungarian Empire was initiated and insisted by Duan Qirui, 6th Premier of the Republic of China

The Republic of China's declaration of war on Germany was a topic of vigorous debate from April to May 1917 in the first National Assembly of the Republic of China governed by the Beiyang government, involving the question of whether to participate in World War I by declaring war on Germany.

The National Assembly had already ratified the cessation of diplomatic relations with Germany in February and March. The hawkish faction in the assembly was led by Premier Duan Qirui, who had secretly borrowed money from the Japanese government, as the press revealed in May in a scandal called the Nishihara Loans. This caused the National Assembly to delay the declaration of war.

After a failed attempt to restore the Manchu Imperial House in July, the dovish faction suffered a setback in the resignation of President Li Yuanhong. The second Duan cabinet then declared war against the German Empire and Austria-Hungary on 14 August 1917, denouncing all treaties with them, retrieving the concessions and leases in Tianjin and Hankou from them, and supporting the Entente Powers. The controversy over the declaration of war against Germany was part of the power struggle between the president and the premier in the nascent Republic of China.
