= Huimin Company =

Chinese labor recruitment company

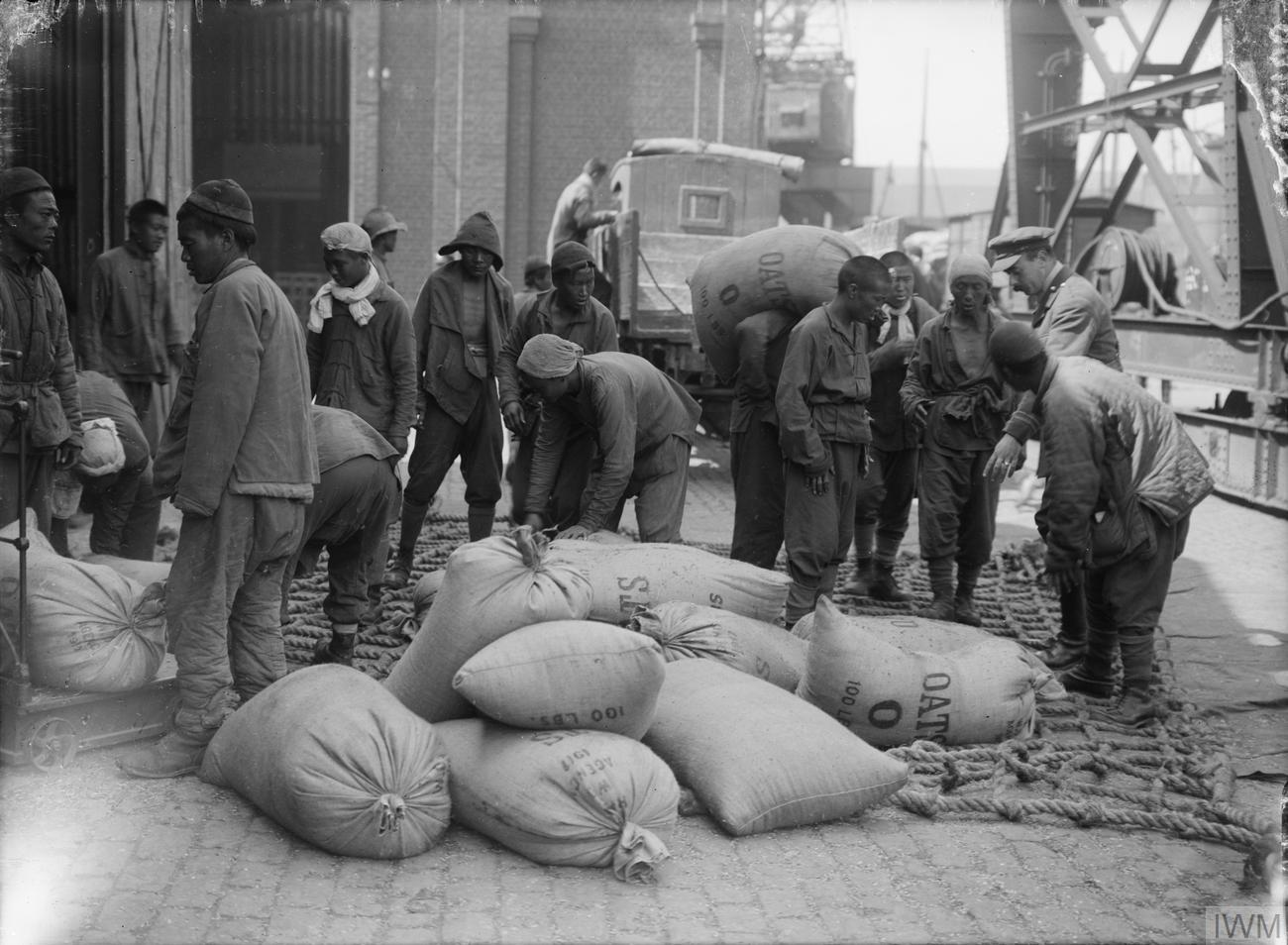
- Company type: Labour recruitment
- Founded: 1916
- Key people: Liang Shiyi

The Huimin Company organized 25 shipments of labourers from China to unload military supplies and handle ammunitions, built barracks and other military facilities, dug trenches, and provided agriculture and forest management during the First World War in France, as part of the Chinese Labour Corps.

== The Huimin contract ==
The initial proposal to send Chinese labourers came from government minister Liang Shiyi in early June 1915. The recruitment process was initiated in 1916 in London, to create the Chinese Labour Corps, a group of Chinese labourers to assist in France. The Huimin contract with the French government was signed on 14 May 1916, in Beijing. It was agreed to send 50,000 labourers. 1,698 labourers first departed from Tianjin for Dagu and Marseilles on 12 July 1916. Under the control of Shiyi, it was largely state-run.

== Bibliography ==
- Xu, Guoqi (2011). Strangers on the Western Front: Chinese Workers in the Great War. Cambridge: Harvard University Press. ISBN 978-0-674-04999-4.
