= Metchosin =

- District municipality
- District of Metchosin
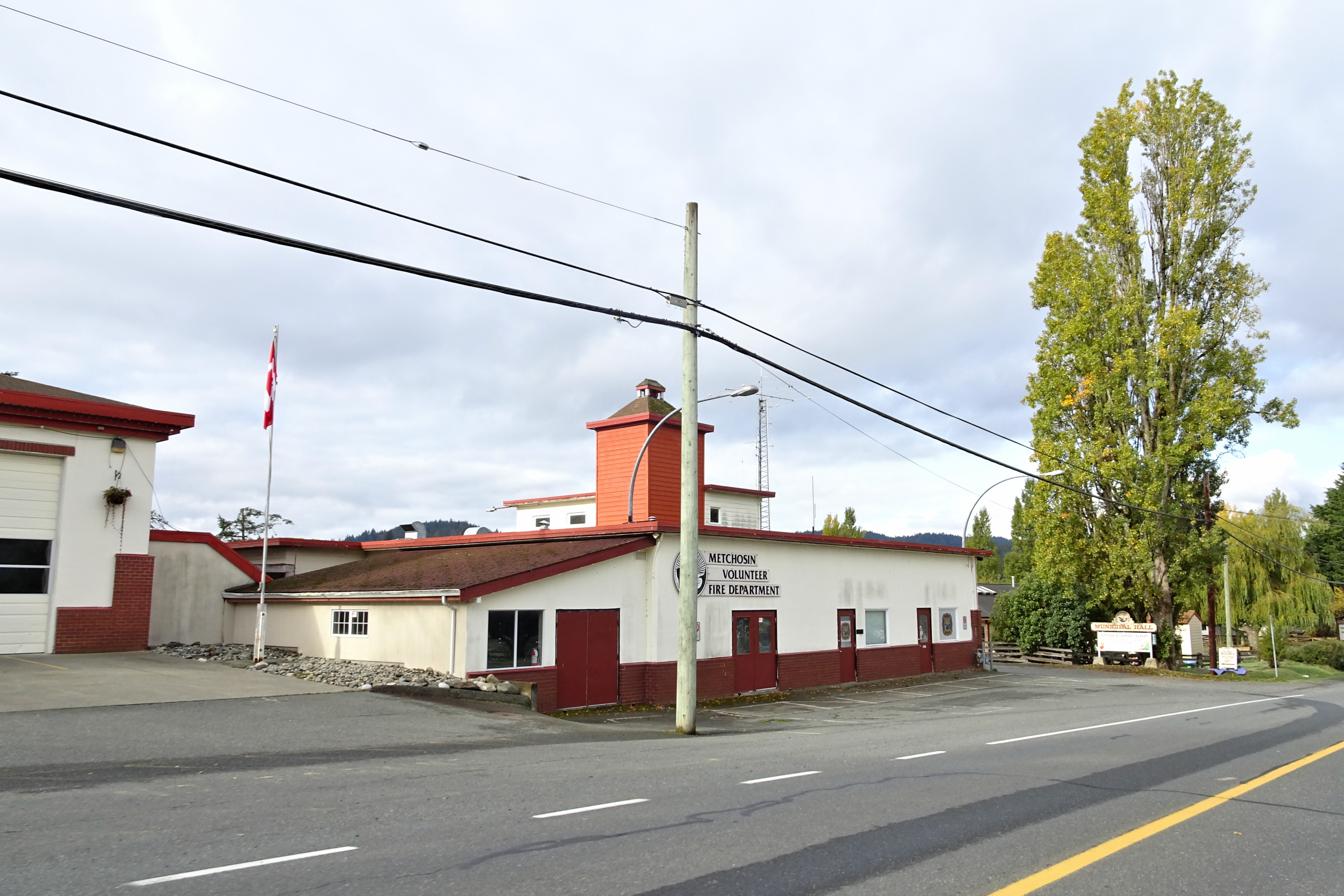
- Metchosin town and fire hall

- Location of Metchosin within the Capital Regional District

- Location of Metchosin in British Columbia Metchosin (British Columbia)
- Coordinates: 48°22′55″N 123°32′16″W
- Country: Canada
- Province: British Columbia
- Regional district: Capital
- Founded: 1840
- Incorporated: 1984

Government
  - Governing body: Metchosin Council
  - Mayor: Marie-Térèse Little

Area
  - Land: 69.57 km^{2} (26.86 sq mi)
- Elevation: 40 m (130 ft)

Population (2021)
  - Total: 5,067
  - Density: 72.8/km^{2} (189/sq mi)
- Demonym: Metchosinite
- Time zone: UTC−07:00 (PT)
- Highways: Highway 14
- Website: www.metchosin.ca

The District of Metchosin (/məˈtʃoʊzɪn/) is a municipality and community in Greater Victoria on the southern tip of Vancouver Island in British Columbia, Canada. It is a coastal community adjacent to the Strait of Juan de Fuca. Metchosin is part of the Western Communities and one of the 13 regional municipalities.

The origin of its name is a Straits Salish word, smets-shosin, meaning "place of stinking fish" or "place smelling of fish oil."

== History ==
Following the establishment of farms by the Puget Sound Agricultural Company in the Victoria area, independent settlers entered the Metchosin area. In 1851, Captain Cooper bought land on the shores of Witty's Lagoon, that became the first farm in Metchosin, called Bilston Farm and farmed by Thomas Blinkhorn. Other settlers followed and cleared the arable land.

In 1861, Race Rocks Lighthouse was built. In the early 1880s, two quarantine stations were built by the federal government, first on Albert Head in 1883 and then William Head, which inspected and controlled all people entering Canada for infectious diseases. Starting in 1924, Bentinck Island was used as a leper colony. As medical procedures progressed, the leper colony was closed in 1956, and in 1958, the quarantine station at William Head was converted into a minimum-security prison. The station at Albert Head became part of CFB Esquimalt.

In 1984, the Municipality of the District of Metchosin was incorporated, mainly to protect its rural character from the encroaching suburban sprawl.

== Geography ==
=== Climate ===
Metchosin has a warm-summer Mediterranean climate (Köppen: Csb) in parts caused by the rain shadow and to the east of the strait of the Strait of Juan de Fuca, but keeping some oceanic characteristics (Cfb). Sligo, Ireland has very close temperatures with only a slightly warmer summer. The biggest difference is in the summer drying, common of the Pacific Northwest.

Climate data for Metchosin. elevation: 164 m or 538 ft, extremes 1911-1938
Month	Jan	Feb	Mar	Apr	May	Jun	Jul	Aug	Sep	Oct	Nov	Dec	Year
Record high °C (°F)	12.2 (54.0)	15 (59)	18.3 (64.9)	23.9 (75.0)	29.4 (84.9)	32.2 (90.0)	32.2 (90.0)	31.1 (88.0)	30 (86)	24.4 (75.9)	15.6 (60.1)	14.4 (57.9)	32.2 (90.0)
Record low °C (°F)	−13.9 (7.0)	−12.2 (10.0)	−4.4 (24.1)	−2.8 (27.0)	−0.6 (30.9)	1.7 (35.1)	3.9 (39.0)	5.6 (42.1)	−0.6 (30.9)	−5 (23)	−6.1 (21.0)	−12.2 (10.0)	−13.9 (7.0)
Average precipitation mm (inches)	168.1 (6.62)	107.5 (4.23)	89.2 (3.51)	59.8 (2.35)	39.9 (1.57)	28.0 (1.10)	16.5 (0.65)	24.8 (0.98)	32.6 (1.28)	112.8 (4.44)	213.0 (8.39)	146.8 (5.78)	1,039 (40.9)
Average rainfall mm (inches)	159.5 (6.28)	100.5 (3.96)	85.8 (3.38)	59.8 (2.35)	39.9 (1.57)	28.0 (1.10)	16.5 (0.65)	24.8 (0.98)	32.6 (1.28)	112.5 (4.43)	207.8 (8.18)	140.6 (5.54)	1,008.3 (39.7)
Average snowfall cm (inches)	8.6 (3.4)	7.0 (2.8)	3.4 (1.3)	0.0 (0.0)	0.0 (0.0)	0.0 (0.0)	0.0 (0.0)	0.0 (0.0)	0.0 (0.0)	0.3 (0.1)	5.2 (2.0)	6.2 (2.4)	30.7 (12)
Average precipitation days (≥ 0.2 mm)	19.5	15.2	17.7	14.6	11.7	8.8	4.8	4.9	7.2	15.0	21.0	18.3	158.7
Average rainy days (≥ 0.2 mm)	18.7	14.4	17.5	14.6	11.7	8.8	4.8	4.9	7.2	14.9	20.6	17.6	155.7
Average snowy days (≥ 0.2 cm)	1.7	1.7	0.92	0.0	0.0	0.0	0.0	0.0	0.0	0.08	0.8	1.4	6.6
Source: Environment Canada

== Demographics ==
In the 2021 Census of Population conducted by Statistics Canada, Metchosin had a population of 5,067 living in 1,856 of its 1,938 total private dwellings, a change of 7.6% from its 2016 population of 4,708. With a land area of 69.57 km^{2} (26.86 sq mi), it had a population density of 72.8/km^{2} (188.6/sq mi) in 2021.

Historical census populations – Metchosin

Year	Pop.	±%
1986	3,676	—
1991	4,232	+15.1%
1996	4,709	+11.3%
2001	4,857	+3.1%

Year	Pop.	±%
2006	4,795	−1.3%
2011	4,803	+0.2%
2016	4,708	−2.0%
2021	5,067	+7.6%

Source: Statistics Canada

=== Ethnicity ===
Panethnic groups in the District of Metchosin (1996−2021)
Panethnic group	2021		2016		2011		2006		2001		1996	
Panethnic group	Pop.	%	Pop.	%	Pop.	%	Pop.	%	Pop.	%	Pop.	%
European (Note: Statistic includes all persons that did not make up part of a visible minority or an indigenous identity.)	4,300	91.3%	4,245	93.92%	4,155	92.54%	4,360	92.96%	4,255	92%	4,155	93.27%
Indigenous	225	4.78%	135	2.99%	210	4.68%	115	2.45%	180	3.89%	40	0.9%
East Asian (Note: Statistic includes total responses of "Chinese", "Korean", and "Japanese" under visible minority section on census.)	85	1.8%	95	2.1%	70	1.56%	45	0.96%	25	0.54%	75	1.68%
South Asian	35	0.74%	10	0.22%	30	0.67%	45	0.96%	50	1.08%	20	0.45%
African	25	0.53%	10	0.22%	0	0%	35	0.75%	60	1.3%	75	1.68%
Southeast Asian (Note: Statistic includes total responses of "Filipino" and "Southeast Asian" under visible minority section on census.)	20	0.42%	20	0.44%	0	0%	20	0.43%	20	0.43%	60	1.35%
Middle Eastern (Note: Statistic includes total responses of "West Asian" and "Arab" under visible minority section on census.)	0	0%	10	0.22%	0	0%	20	0.43%	25	0.54%	10	0.22%
Latin American	0	0%	0	0%	0	0%	35	0.75%	20	0.43%	30	0.67%
Other/multiracial (Note: Statistic includes total responses of "Visible minority, n.i.e." and "Multiple visible minorities" under visible minority section on census.)	0	0%	10	0.22%	0	0%	15	0.32%	10	0.22%	0	0%
Total responses	4,710	92.95%	4,520	96.01%	4,490	93.48%	4,690	97.81%	4,625	95.22%	4,455	94.61%
Total population	5,067	100%	4,708	100%	4,803	100%	4,795	100%	4,857	100%	4,709	100%
Note: Totals greater than 100% due to multiple origin responses.

=== Religion ===
According to the 2021 census, religious groups in Metchosin included:

- Irreligion (3,120 persons or 66.2%)
- Christianity (1,480 persons or 31.4%)
- Buddhism (20 persons or 0.4%)
- Other (80 persons or 1.7%)

== Parks ==
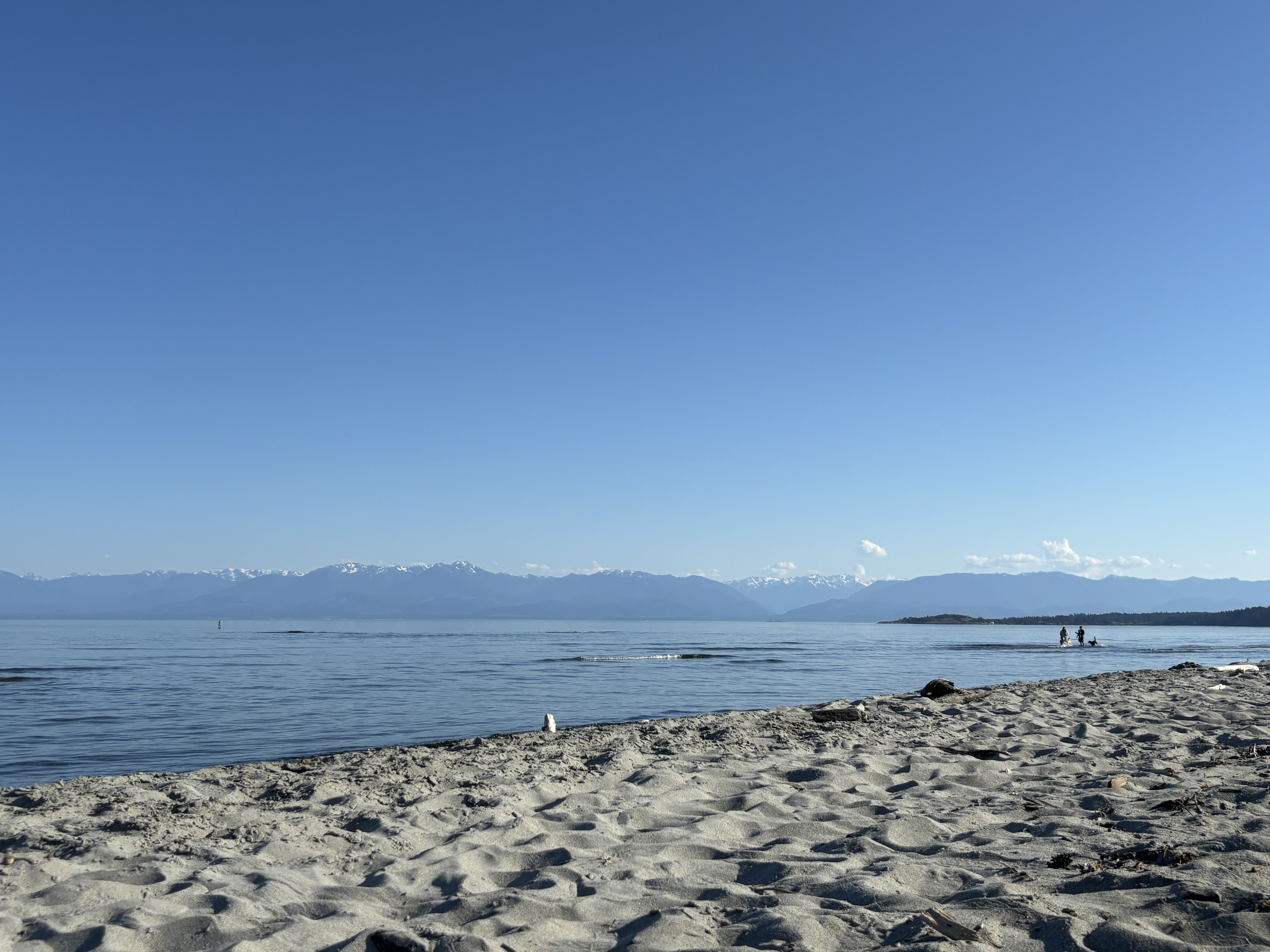
Witty's Lagoon

- Albert Head Lagoon Regional Park
- Blinkhorn Nature Park
- Buckbrush Swamp
- Devonian Regional Park
- Matheson Lake Regional Park
- Witty's Lagoon Regional Park
- Galloping Goose Regional Park
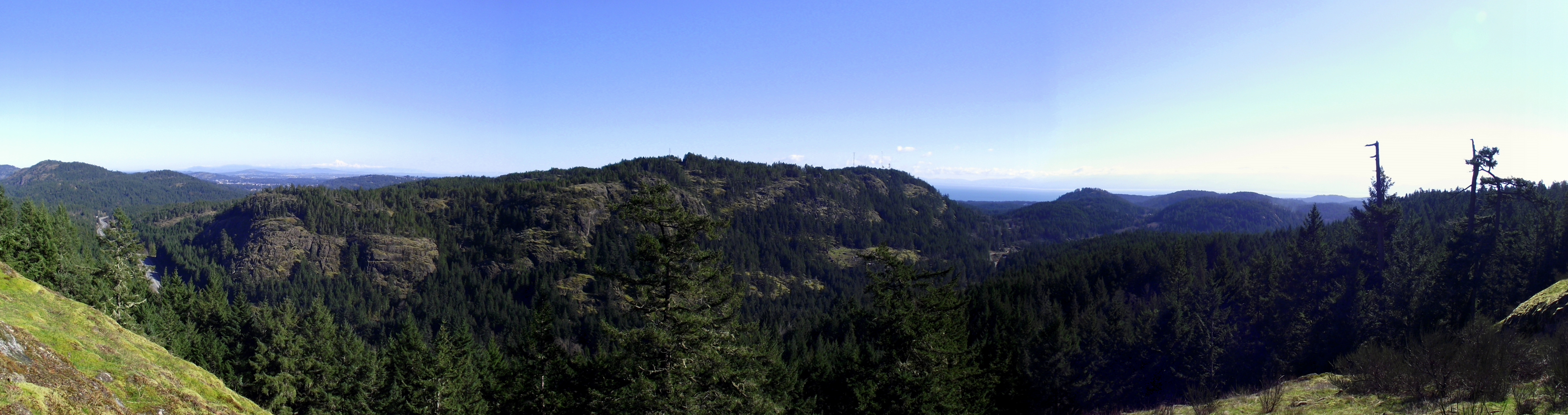
Mount Helmcken
