= Chinese Labour Corps =

Workers for the British Army in WWI

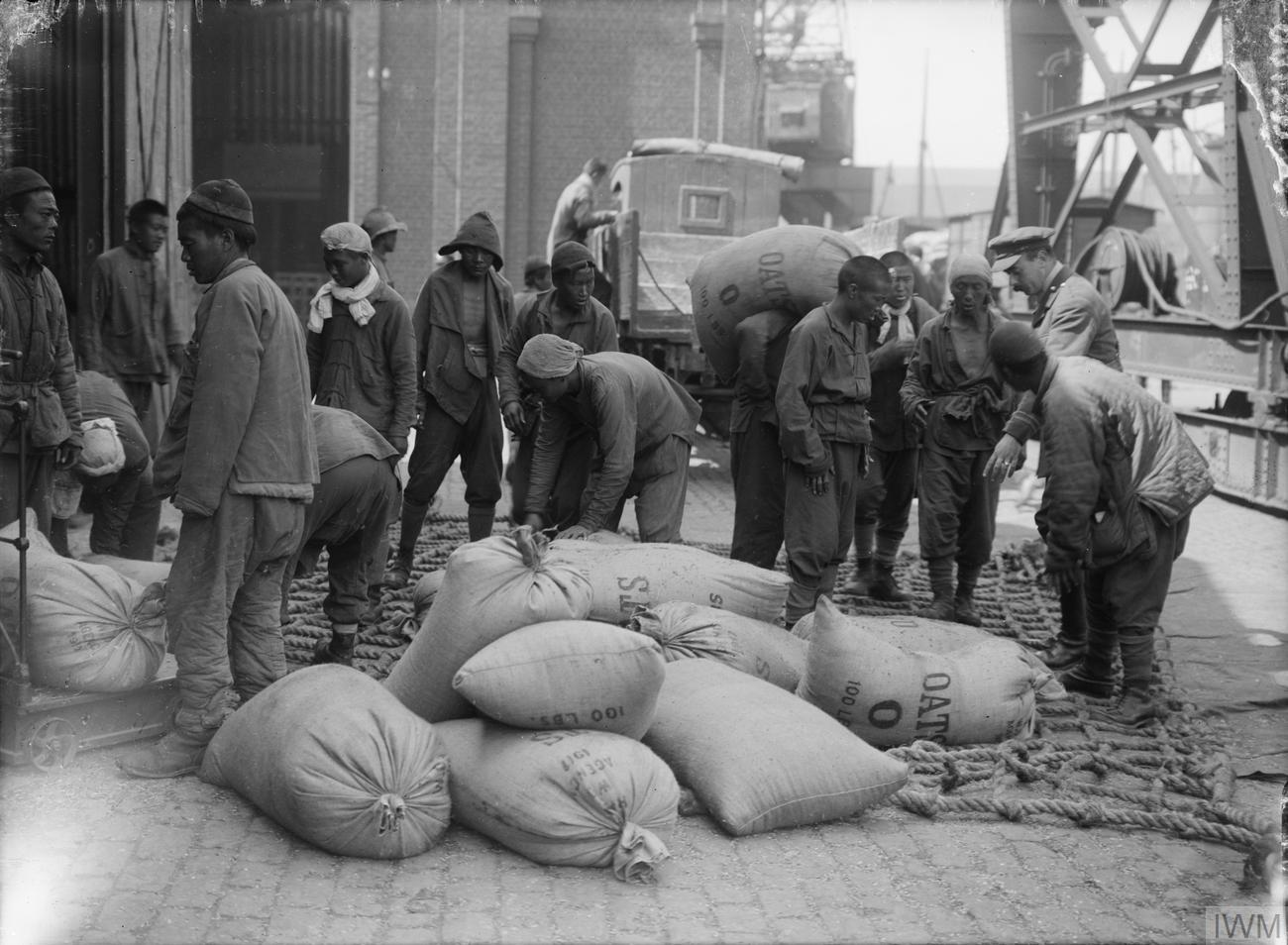
Men of the Chinese Labour Corps load sacks of oats onto a lorry at Boulogne while supervised by a British officer (12 August 1917)

The Chinese Labour Corps (CLC; French: Corps de Travailleurs Chinois; simplified Chinese: 中国劳工旅; traditional Chinese: 中國勞工旅; pinyin: Zhōngguó láogōng lǚ) was a labour corps recruited by the British government in the First World War to free troops for front line duty by performing support work and manual labour. The French government also recruited a significant number of Chinese labourers, and although those labourers working for the French were recruited separately and not part of the CLC, the term is often used to encompass both groups. In all, some 140,000 men served for both British and French forces before the war ended and most of the men were repatriated to China between 1918 and 1920.

== Origins ==
In 1916, Field Marshal Sir Douglas Haig requested that 21,000 labourers be recruited to fill the manpower shortage caused by casualties during the First World War. Recruiting labourers from other countries was not something unusual at that time. Other than the Chinese, labour corps were serving in France from Egypt, Fiji, India, Malta, Mauritius, Seychelles, and the British West Indies, as well as a labour corps from South Africa. At the end of the war, an estimated over 300,000 workers from the colonies, 100,000 Egyptians, 21,000 Indians and 20,000 black South Africans were working throughout France and the Middle East by 1918.

As China was initially not a belligerent nation, her citizens were not allowed by the Chinese government to participate in the fighting. As a result, the early stage of recruiting in China was somewhat sketchy, with semi-official support from local authorities. However, after China declared war against Germany and Austria-Hungary, on 14 August 1917, the Labour Department of the Chinese government began organizing the recruitment officially.

The scheme to recruit Chinese to serve as non-military personnel was pioneered by the French government. A contract to supply 50,000 labourers was agreed upon on 14 May 1916, and the first contingent left Tientsin for Dagu and Marseille in July 1916. The British government also signed an agreement with the Chinese authorities to supply labourers. The recruiting was launched by the War Committee in London in 1916 to form a labour corps of labourers from China to serve in France and to be known as the Chinese Labour Corps. A former railway engineer, Thomas J. Bourne, who had worked in China for 28 years, arrived at Weihaiwei (then a British colony) on 31 October 1916 with instructions to establish and run a recruiting base.

The Chinese Labour Corps comprised Chinese men who came mostly from the Northern province of Shandong, and to a lesser extent from Liaoning, Jilin, Jiangsu, Hubei, Hunan, Anhui and Gansu provinces, and a minority, consisting of roughly 2,000 people, from Zhejiang province in the South. The first transport ship carrying 1,088 labourers sailed from the main depot at Weihaiwei on 18 January 1917. The journey to France took three months. Most travelled to Europe (and later returned to China) via the Pacific and across Canada. The tens of thousands of volunteers were driven by the poverty of the region and China's political uncertainties, and also lured by the generosity of the wages offered by the British. Each volunteer received an embarkment fee of 20 yuan, followed by 10 yuan a month to be paid over to his family in China.

Two of the unit's commanders, Colonel Bryan Charles Fairfax and Colonel R.L. Purdon, had served with the 1st Chinese Regiment in the Boxer Rebellion in 1900.

== Service ==
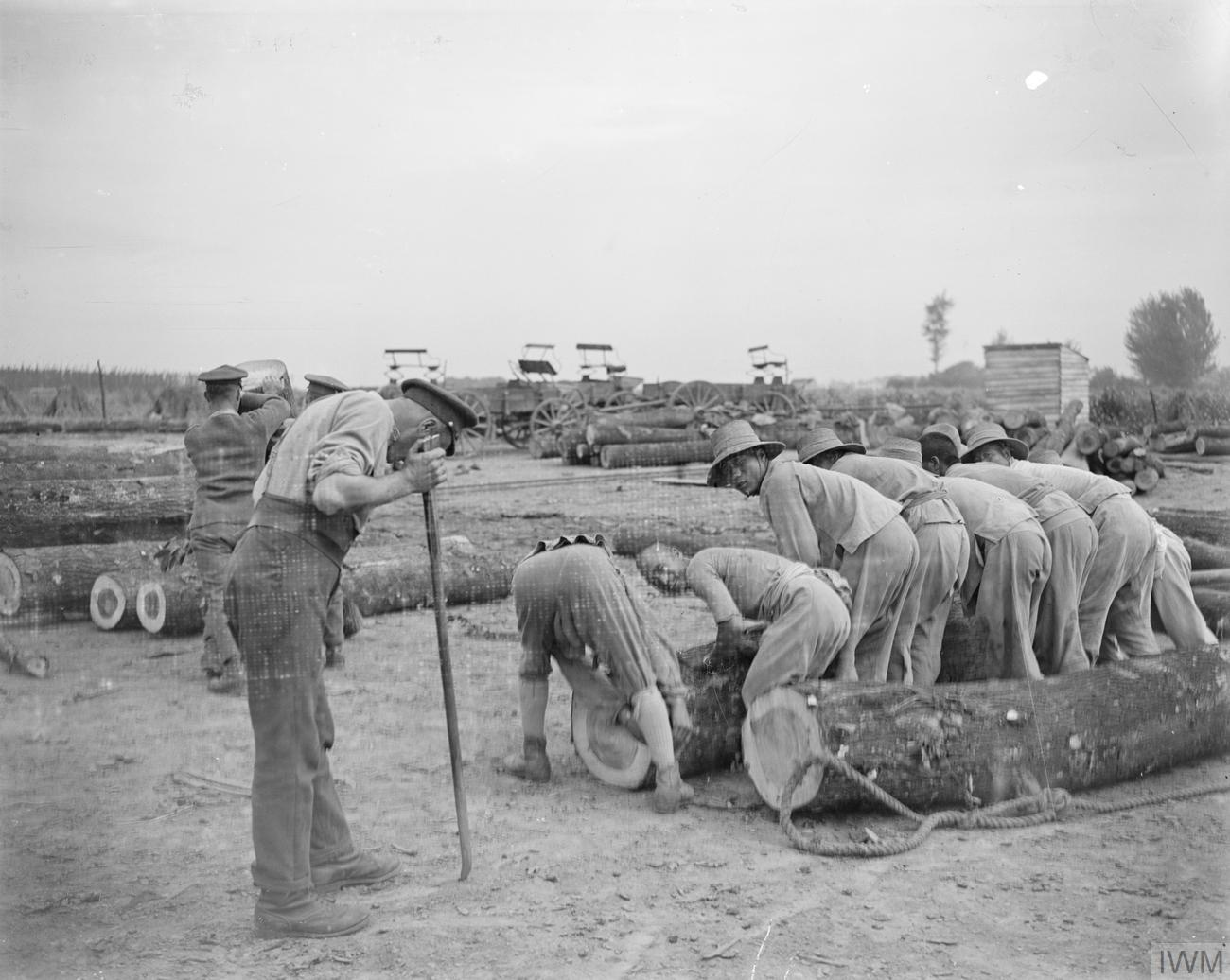
Members of the Chinese Labour Corps and British soldiers working at a timber yard, Caëstre, July 1917.

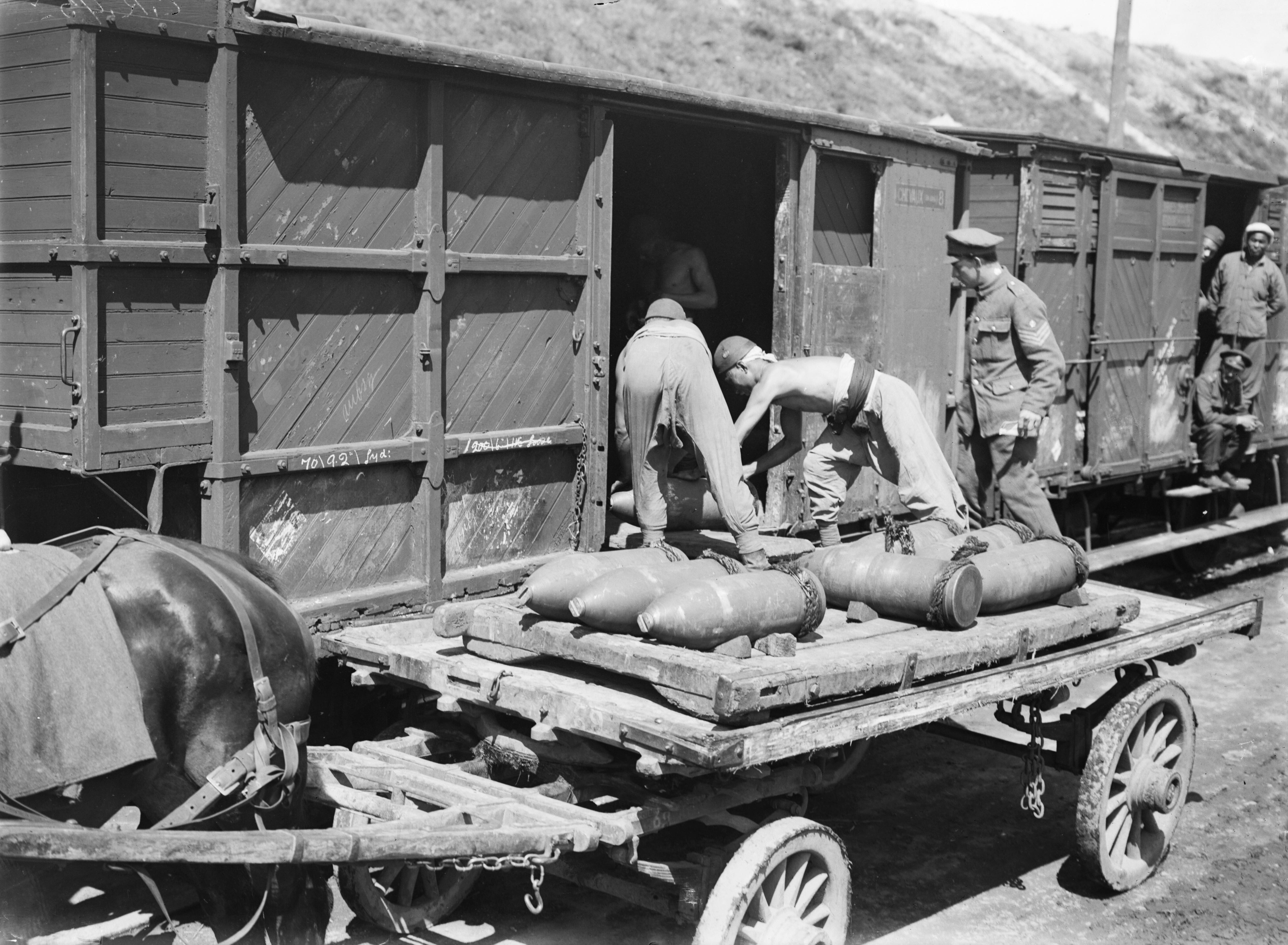
CLC men load 9.2-inch shells onto a railway wagon at Boulogne for transport to the front line, August 1917

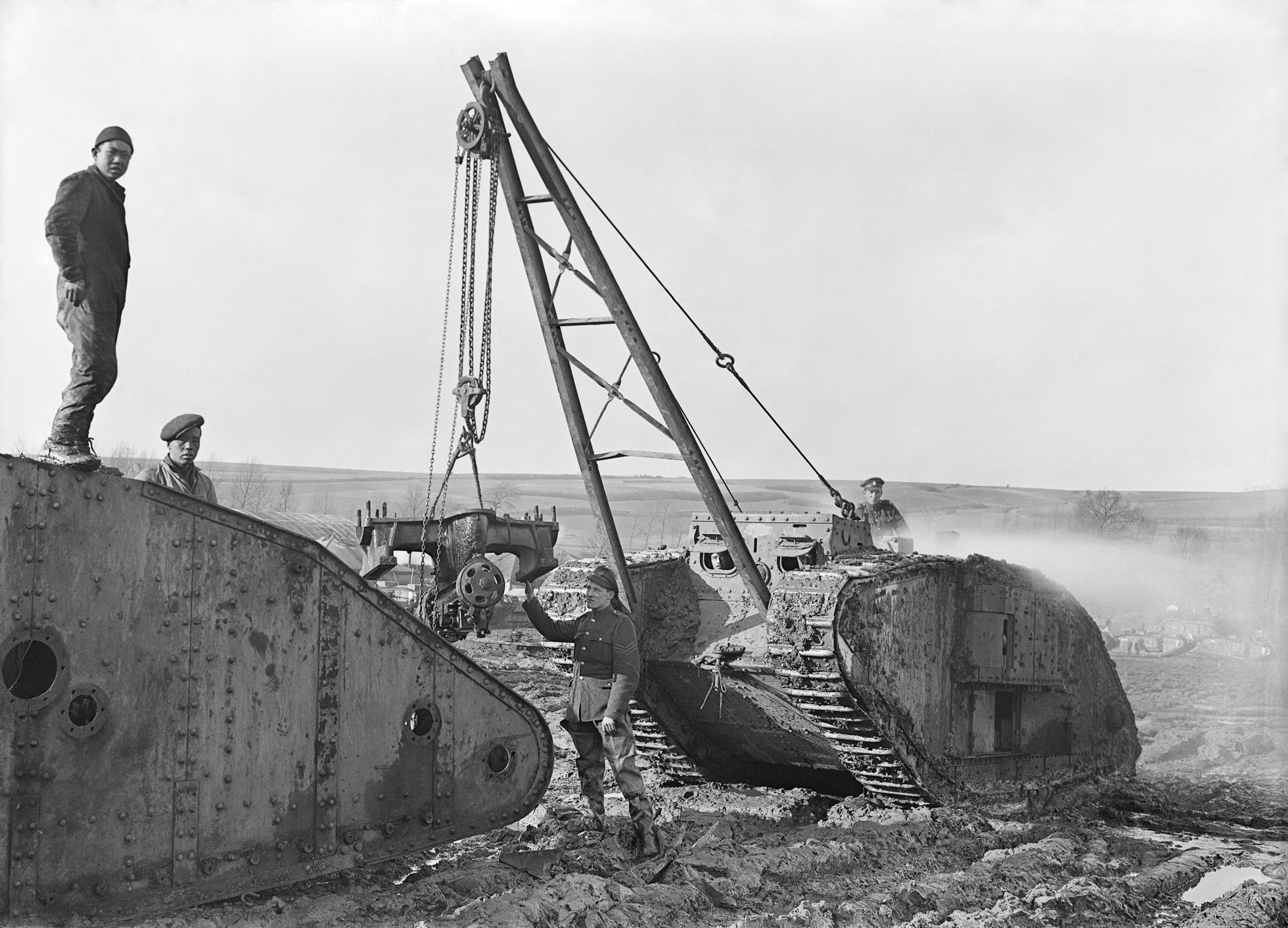
Labour Corps men and a British soldier cannibalise a wrecked Mark IV tank for spare parts at the central stores of the Tank Corps, Teneur, spring 1918.

A deal between the Chinese government and the allies resulted in the enlistment of thousands of Chinese who formed the Chinese Labour Corps (CLC), mainly poor Chinese men from the north who were told they would be in non-combatant roles. The Canadian government had restricted the arrival of all Asians and the CLC were secretly landed at Victoria, British Columbia. They were drilled in the former William Head quarantine station in Metchosin, British Columbia on Vancouver Island. Roughly 81,000 Chinese men were then taken on Canadian Pacific Railway trains to Halifax to board steamships to England. On arrival, they crossed the English Channel to France. After the War, over 40,000 returned by ship to Halifax and then by train to Vancouver; they were returned by ship to China. An unknown number of the labourers never made it to Europe, died and buried in unmarked graves in British Columbia (including 21 at William Head) and Ontario (one known grave, of Chou Ming Shan, in Petawawa, Ontario).

A total of about 140,000 Chinese labourers served on the Western Front during and after the war. Among them, 100,000 served in the British Chinese Labour Corps. About 40,000 served with the French forces, and hundreds of Chinese students served as translators.

By the end of 1917, 54,000 Chinese labourers were working with the British Armed Forces in France and Belgium. In March, the Admiralty declared itself no longer able to supply the ships for transport and the British government were obliged to bring recruitment to an end. The men already serving in France completed their contracts. By the time of the armistice, the CLC numbered nearly 96,000, while a further 30,000 were working for the French.

In May 1919, 80,000 Chinese Labour Corps were still at work. The British soldier Arthur Bullock, in his wartime memoir, gives an account of the interactions between the British soldiers and Chinese workers. He also drew a sketch of one Chinese labourer, Tchung Camena Tungwa, who invited Bullock to have tea with him in Peking whenever he visited the city. (Bullock was never able to make the trip). Also an armed company of the Corps were employed in 1919 with the British North Russian Relief Force at Arkhangelsk among reinforcements to assist the withdrawal of British and allied forces from the Russian Civil War.

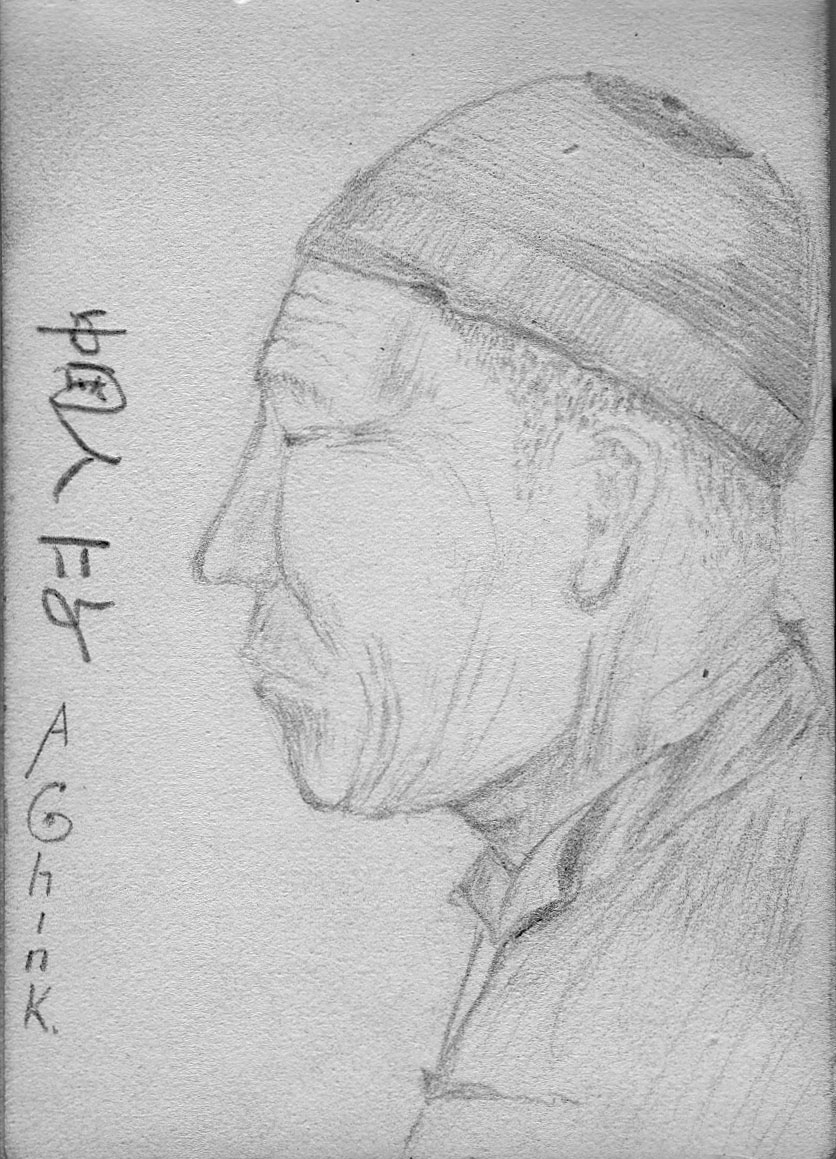
Portrait by Arthur Stanley Bullock of Tchung Camena Tungwa, member of the Chinese Labour Corps, 1919

The workers, mainly aged between 20 and 35, served as labour in the rear echelons or helped build munitions depots. They carried out essential work to support the frontline troops, such as unloading ships, building dugouts, repairing roads and railways, digging trenches, and filling sandbags. Some worked in armaments factories, others in naval shipyards, for a low wage of one to three francs a day. At the time, they were seen as cheap labour, and were not allowed out of camp to fraternise locally. When the war ended, some were used for mine clearance, or to recover the bodies of soldiers and fill in miles of trenches. Men fell ill from poor diets and the intense damp and cold, and on occasion, they mutinied against their French and British employers or ransacked local restaurants in search of food. The harshness of the conditions in which some of these men worked is recorded by Bullock, he also recalled the differences between the 'coolies' and the German prisoners of war, in terms of their attitudes to work and to each other.

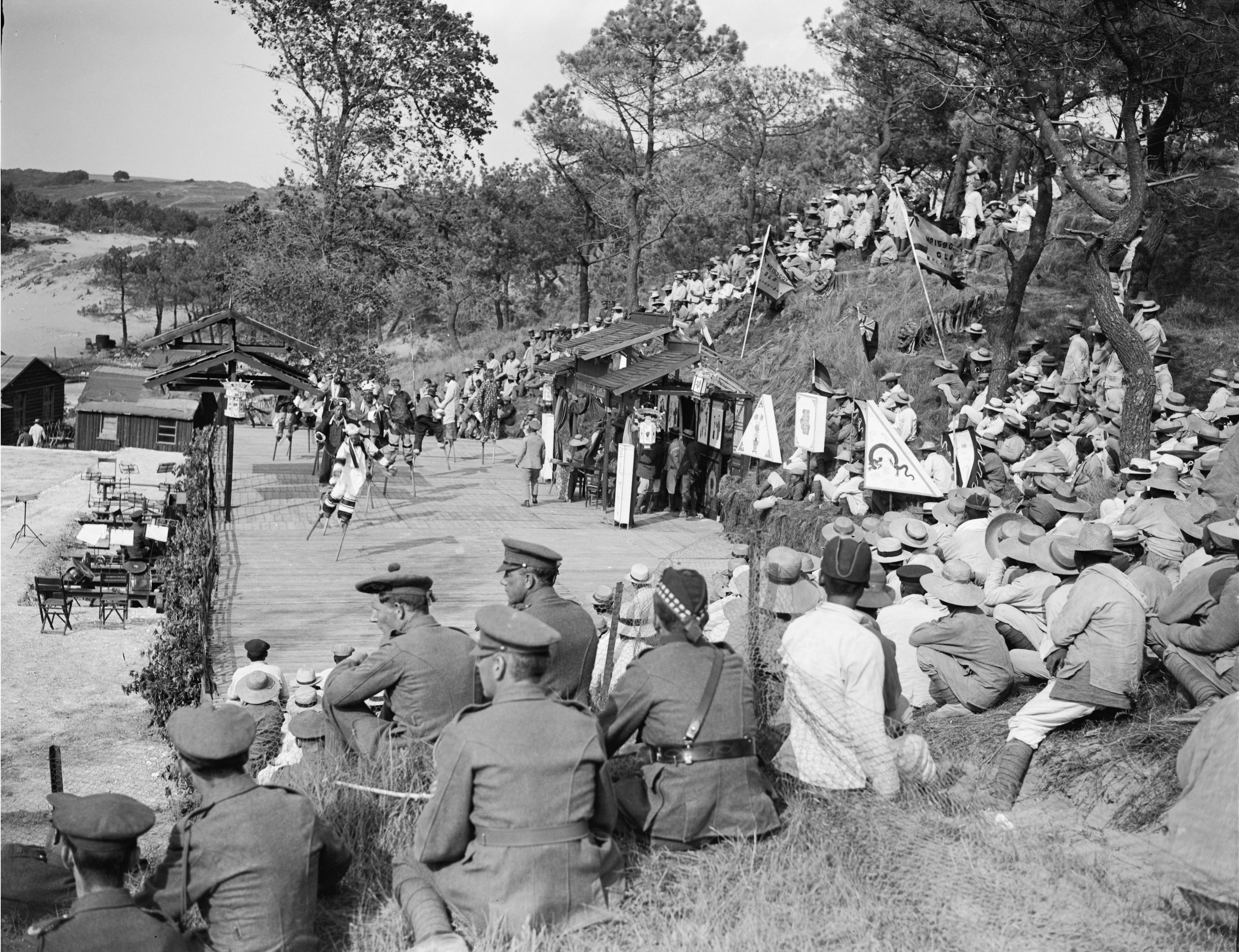
Chinese performers entertain Labour Corps members and British troops at an open-air theatre at Étaples (June 1918).

Throughout the war, trade union pressure prevented the introduction of Chinese labourers to the British Isles. Sidney and Beatrice Webb suggested that the CLC was restricted to carrying out menial unskilled labour due to pressure from British trade unions. However, some members of the corps carried out skilled and semiskilled work for the Tank Corps, including riveting and engine repair.

One member of the corps, First Class Ganger Liu Dien Chen, was recommended for the Military Medal for rallying his men while under shellfire in March 1918. However, he was eventually awarded the Meritorious Service Medal, as it was decided CLC members were not eligible for the Military Medal. By the end of the war, the Meritorious Service Medal for bravery had been awarded to five Chinese workers.

== Aftermath and legacies ==
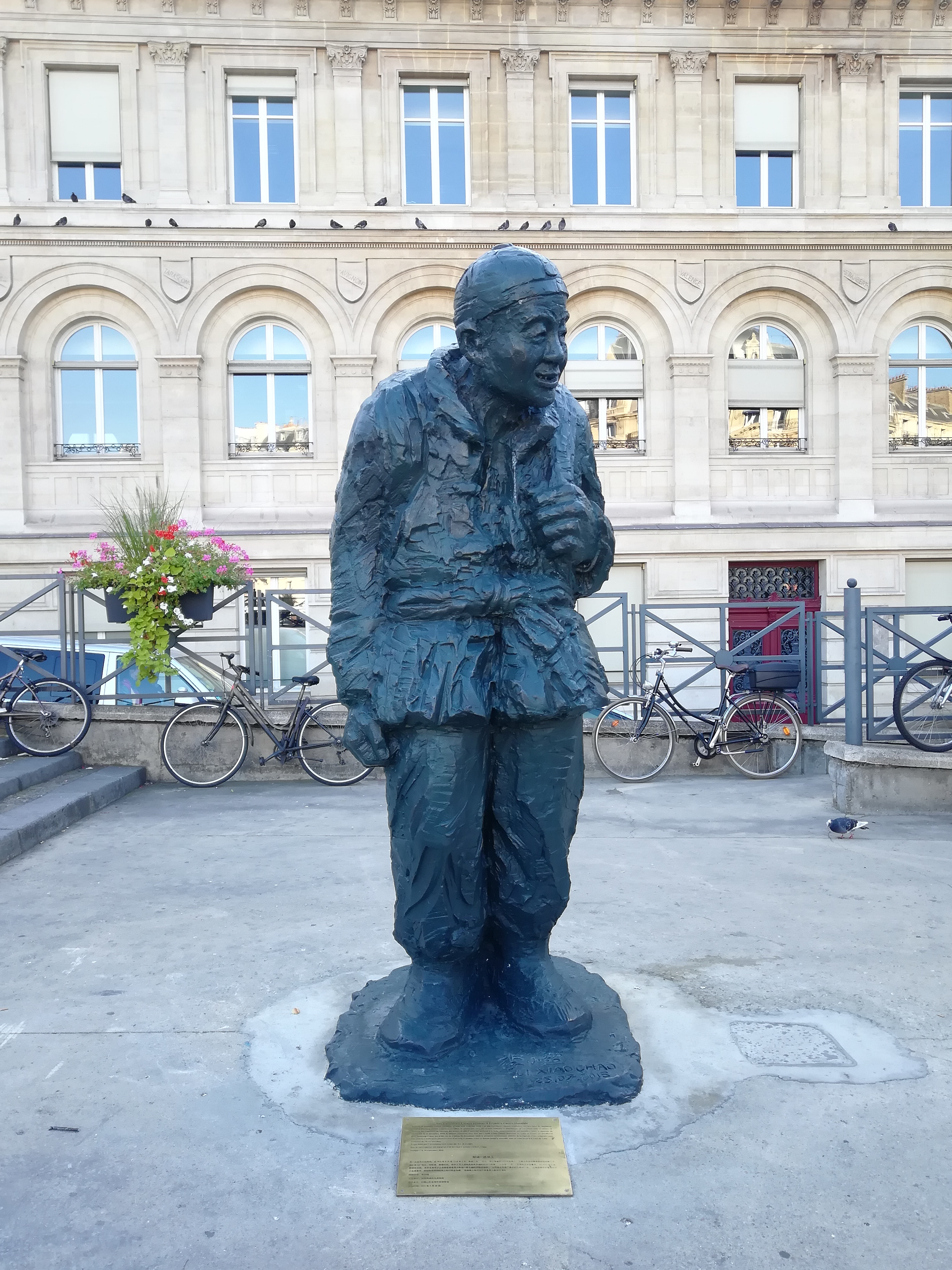
A bronze statue dedicated to the WWI Chinese labourers outside Gare de Lyon, Paris.

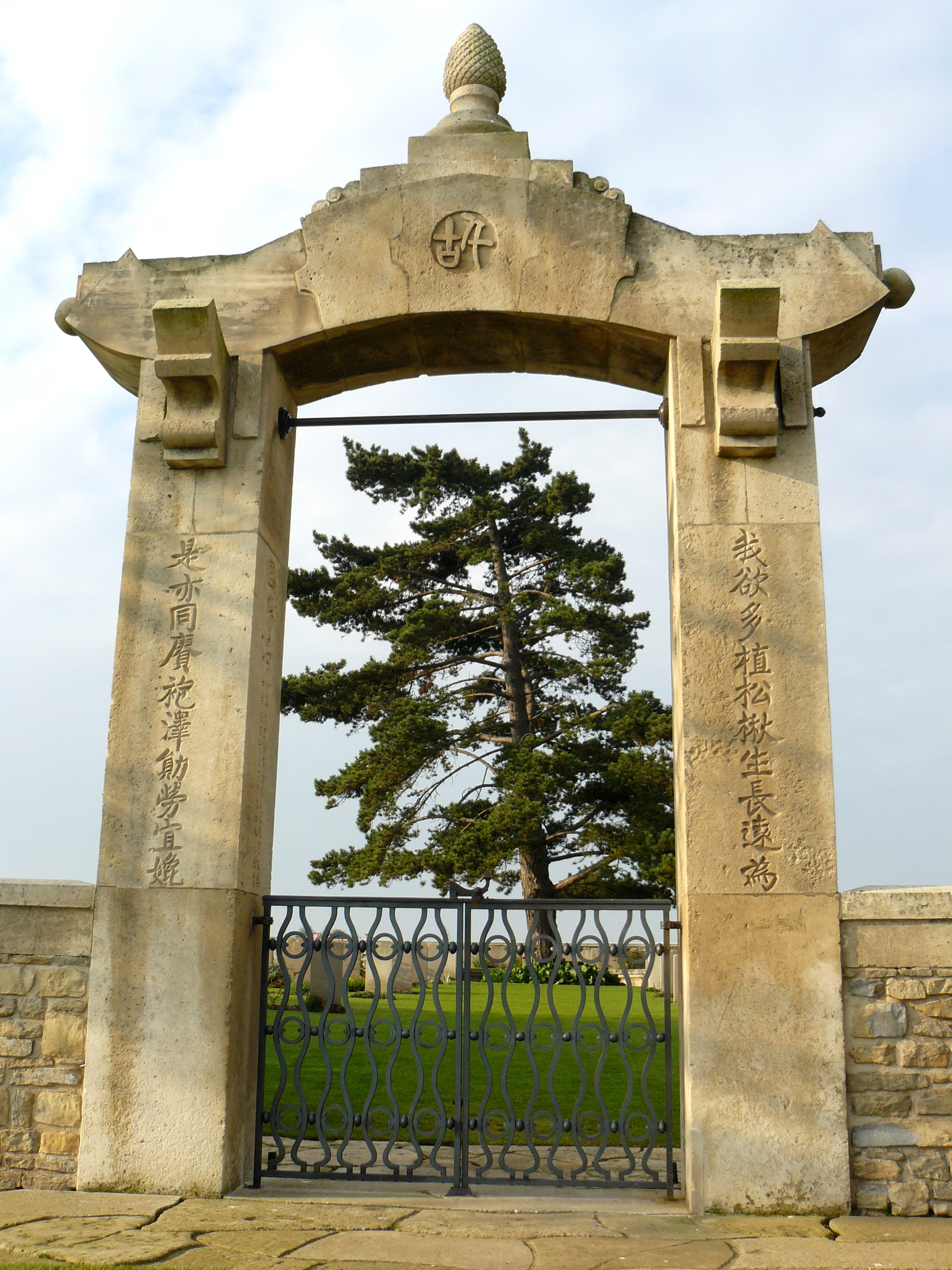
Entrance, Chinese cemetery at Noyelles-sur-Mer. Above the arch are the characters 万古 (wàngǔ, 'eternity').

After the armistice of 11 November, Chinese labourers, each identified by a reference number, were given transport back to China between December 1918 and September 1920. Around 5,000 to 7,000 of them decided to stay in France, and a disproportionate number of those who settled permanently in Paris, particularly in the area around the Gare de Lyon, came from Qingtian, a mountainous county in Zhejiang known for its history of overseas emigration. Despite representing only a small minority within the Chinese Labour Corps as a whole, Qingtianese migrants played an outsized role in shaping the earliest postwar Chinese settlement in Paris, forming the nucleus of later Chinese communities in Paris and France as a whole that would later expand through chain migration.

The workers saw first-hand that life in Europe was far from ideal, and reported this on their return to China. Chinese intellectuals of the New Culture Movement looked on their contribution to the war as a point of pride – Chen Duxiu, for instance, commented that "while the sun does not set on the British Empire, neither does it set on Chinese workers abroad." The CLC had a major impact on the educated youth who came to France to work with them as interpreters, such as James Yen, whose literacy programmes under the auspices of the YMCA showed him the worth and dignity of the Chinese common man. He worked out a 1,000-character primer, which introduced basic literacy and became the basis of his work in China. Other Chinese intellectuals who worked with the CLC in France included Jiang Tingfu and Lin Yutang.

After the war, the British government issued the British War Medal in bronze to all members of the Chinese Labour Corps who entered a theatre of war, while in France the members of the CLC were initially memorialised in the Panthéon de la Guerre which was painted between 1914 and 1918. The CLC was later "airbrushed from history" and became the subject of a documentary.

For decades, the contribution of these Chinese men went largely uncommemorated, until military ceremonies resumed in 2002 at the Chinese cemetery of Noyelles-sur-Mer. The last surviving member of the CLC, Zhu Guisheng (朱桂生), died in La Rochelle on 5 March 2002 at 106 years old. He had also served in the French Army during the Second World War.

== Casualties ==
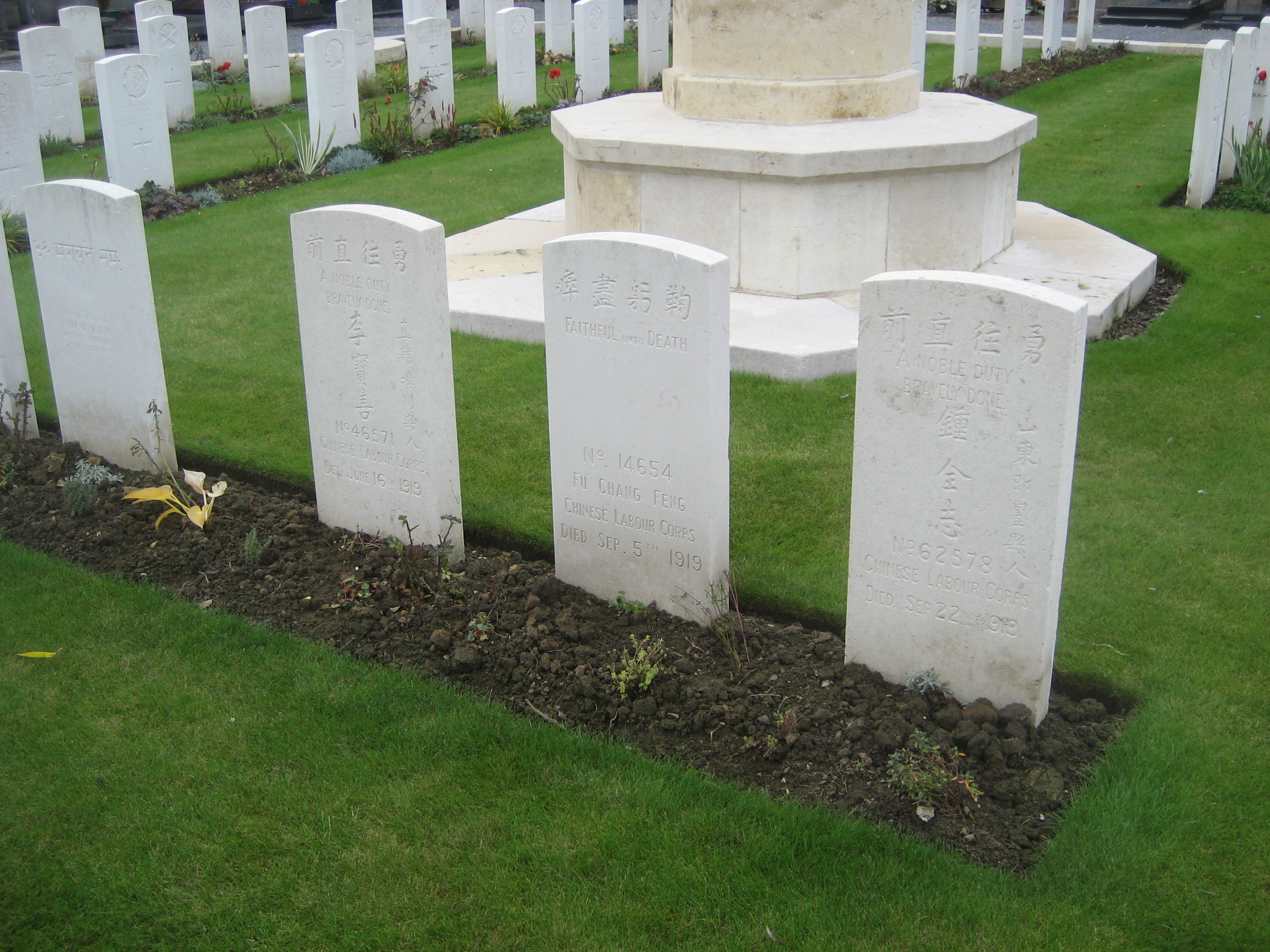
Gravestones in Ascq Communal Cemetery

The CLC did not directly perform in combat. According to the records kept by the British and French recruiters, around 2,000 men of the CLC died during the war, many from the 1918 flu pandemic, with some Chinese scholars estimating the total could be as high as 20,000, victims of shelling, landmines, poor treatment, or the disease. Fifteen members of the corps were sentenced to death for murder during the course of the war. In December 1917, armed guards fired on members of the 21 Company Chinese Labour Corps, killing four and wounding nine.

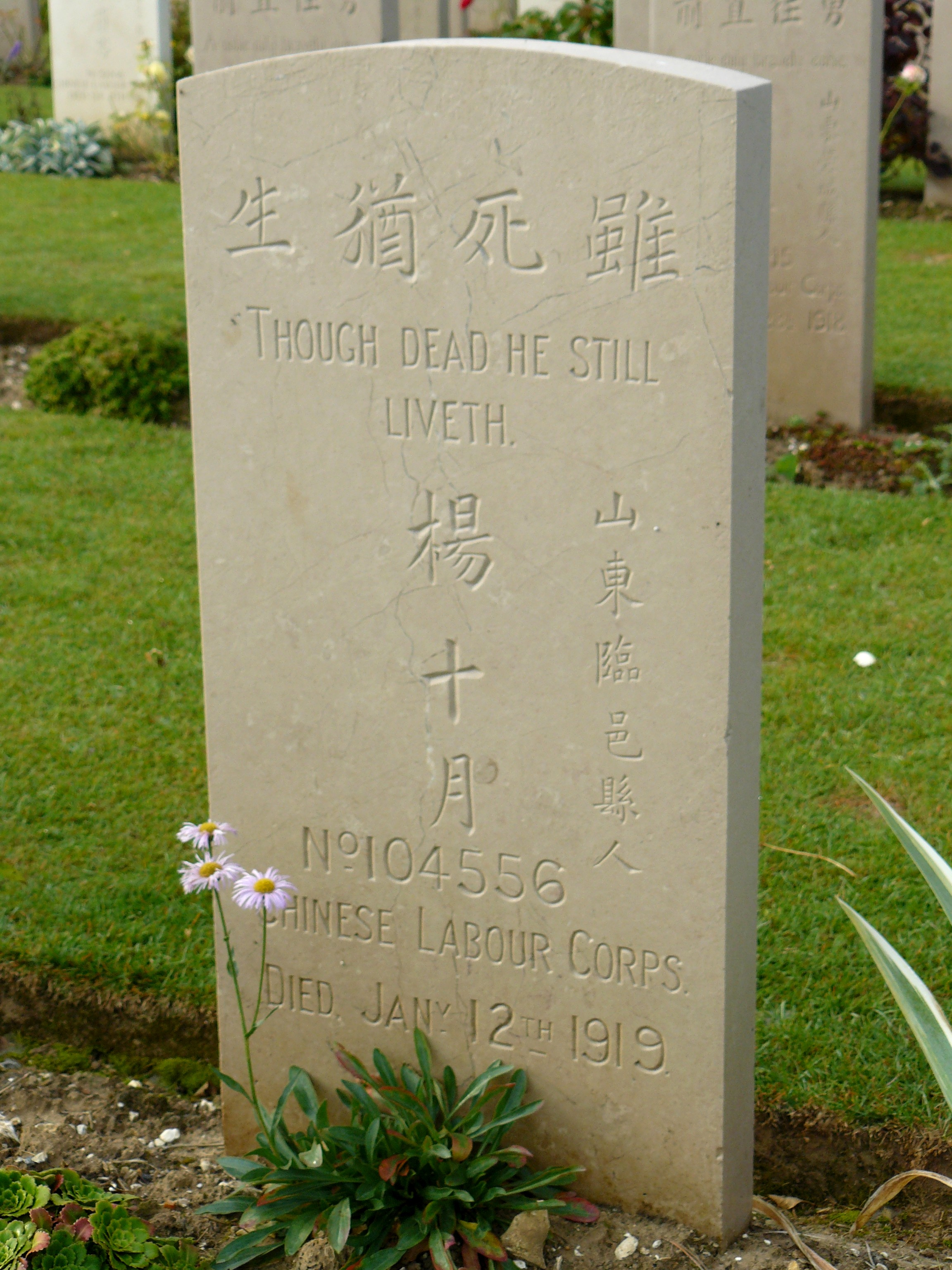
Gravestone in Noyelles-sur-Mer

The members of the CLC who died were classified as war casualties and were buried in about 40 graveyards in the north of France and one in Belgium, with a total of about 2,000 recorded graves. The largest number of graves are at Noyelles-sur-Mer on the Somme, next to the workers' camp of the British army, where a cholera outbreak and some of the fiercest battles occurred, as well. The cemetery contains 842 gravestones, each engraved with Chinese characters, guarded by two stone lions, gifts from China.

One of the four following epitaphs was inscribed on the standard Commonwealth War Grave Portland stone gravestones for members of the CLC: "Faithful unto death (至死忠誠 zhì sǐ zhōngchéng)", "A good reputation endures forever (流芳百世 liúfāng bǎishì)", "A noble duty bravely done (勇往直前 yǒngwǎng zhíqián)", and "Though dead he still liveth (雖死猶生 suī sǐ yóu shēng)", which are English translations of common Chinese idioms for soldiers.

=== Cemeteries with CLC burials ===
France

Location	Cemetery	Number of Burials	Notes
Abbeville	Communal Cemetery Extension.		
Albert	French National Cemetery.		
Arques-la-Bataille	British Cemetery	More than 70	
Ascq	Communal Cemetery.		
Ayette	British Cemetery.		
Beaulencourt	British Cemetery, Ligny-Thilloy		
Blargies	Communal Cemetery Extension		
Caudry	British Cemetery		
Essegney	Charmes Military Cemetery		
Chocques	Military Cemetery		
Ebblinghem	Military Cemetery	1	The grave is numbered "106247" and bears the inscription "A good reputation endures forever." It is listed simply as a "Non-Commonwealth" grave in the register.
Foncquevillers	Military Cemetery	2	
Gezaincourt	Bagneux British Cemetery		
Haute-Avesnes	British Cemetery		
Laventie	Military Cemetery		
Le Portel	Communal Cemetery	1	
Les Rues-des-Vignes	Communal Cemetery	1	
Longuenesse (near Saint-Omer)			There is a special memorial commemorating 23 men of the Chinese Labour Corps whose remains could not be exactly located.
Mazargues	War Cemetery		
Noyelles-sur-Mer	Chinese Cemetery and Memorial	838	A memorial commemorates 40 more who died on land and sea and whose graves are unknown.
Ruminghem	Chinese Cemetery	75	Half the burials were transferred from a Chinese cemetery at Saint-Pol-sur-Mer after the war.
Sains-en-Gohelle	Fosse No.10 Communal Cemetery Extension		
Saint-Étienne-au-Mont	Communal Cemetery	about 170	Most of the cemetery's 170 burials in the Commonwealth Section are Chinese.
Saint-Sever	Cemetery Extension	44	Located within a large communal cemetery situated on the eastern edge of the southern Rouen suburbs of Le Grand Quevilly and Le Petit Quevilly
Sangatte	Les Baraques Military Cemetery	More than 200	
Tincourt-Boucly	New British Cemetery		
Villers-Carbonnel	Communal Cemetery		

Belgium

Location	Cemetery	Number of Burials	Notes
Ypres	New Irish Farm Commonwealth War Graves Commission Cemetery	7	
Kortrijk	(St.Jan) Communal Cemetery	8	
Poperinge	Lijssenthoek Military Cemetery	35	
Elverdinge	Gwalia Cemetery	4	
Kemmel	Klein Vierstraat British Commonwealth War Graves Commission Cemetery	1	
Poperinge	Poperinghe Old Military Cemetery	1	
Poperinge	Poperinghe New Military Cemetery	1	
Proven	Mendinghem Military Cemetery	8	
Reningelst	Reninghelst New Military Cemetery	7	
Poperinge	Haringhe (Bandaghem) Military Cemetery	4	
Vlamertinge	Brandhoek New Military Number 3 Commonwealth War Graves Commission Cemetery	1	
Heuvelland	Westoutre British Cemetery	3	
Westvleteren	Dozinghem Military Cemetery	3	
Wevelgem	Kezelberg Military Cemetery	1	
Heuvelland	Croonaert Chapel Cemetery	1	
Machelen (Zulte)	Machelen French Military Cemetery	1	

Canada

Location	Cemetery	Number of Burials	Notes
Petawawa, Ontario	Garrison Petawawa	1	Chou Ming Shan, died 1917 in Chapleau, Ontario
Metchosin, British Columbia	William Head Prison	21	Site of former Quarantine Station, initial unmarked graves and since documented in 2019.

United Kingdom

Location	Cemetery	Number of Burials	Notes
Plymouth	Efford Cemetery	8	
Folkestone	Shorncliffe Military Cemetery	6	
Liverpool	Anfield Cemetery	3	Research by Professor Gregory Lee indicates that there are three further, unmarked, CLC in the "Chinese" section (Section 17) of Anfield cemetery. The original headstones of the three named CLC members buried in Anfield were recently replaced by the CWGC with new ones.

In addition, 73 labourers have been accepted for commemoration by the CWGC after their deaths were discovered by the researchers of the In From The Cold Project. The majority are commemorated in the CWGC's United Kingdom Book of Remembrance, pending any discovery of their graves.

== See also ==
- Indian Labour Corps
- Maltese Labour Corps
- List of British corps in World War I
- Chinese diaspora in France
- Arthur de Carle Sowerby
- Wang Jungzhi
- Zhu Guisheng, the last veteran of the Chinese Labour Corps
- China during World War I

== References and further reading ==
- Black, Dan (2019). Harry Livingstone's Forgotten Men: Canadians and the Chinese Labour Corps in the First World War. Lorimer. ISBN 978-1459414327.
- Bullock, Arthur (2009). Gloucestershire Between the Wars: A Memoir. The History Press. pp. 97–99, 102, 110–111. ISBN 978-0-7524-4793-3.
- Calvo, Alex and Bao Qiaoni (2015). "Forgotten Voices from the Great War: The Chinese Labor Corps". The Asia-Pacific Journal. 13 (49).
- James, Gregory, The Chinese Labour Corps (1916–1920) (Hong Kong: Bayview Educational, 2013) ISBN 978-988-12686-0-0.
- O'Neill, Mark, The Chinese Labour Corps (The Forgotten Chinese Labourers of the First World War), Penguin Specials, China Specials, (Penguin Books 2014) ISBN 978-0143800316.
- Tapley, Natt (2018). "Chinese Labour Corps in World War One with Wenlan Peng". Dan Snow's History Hit.
- Xu, Guoqi (2011), Strangers on the Western Front: Chinese Workers in the Great War, Cambridge, MA: Harvard University Press, ISBN 978-0-674-04999-4.
