= Dengjiatun incident =

Japanese-Chinese conflict in 1916

Dengjiatun Incident
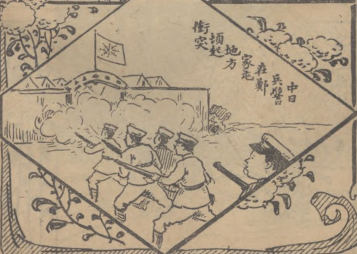
- A contemporary comic depicting Chinese and Japanese troops fighting in Dengjiatun.
- Native name: 郑家屯事件
- English name: Dengjiatun incident
- Date: 13 August 1916
- Venue: The city of Dengjiatun
- Location: Jilin, Republic of China
- Cause: Merchant dispute
- Participants: Fengtian Army; Japanese Imperial Army
- Outcome: Chinese apology Failure to defeat Babojab
- Deaths: 16
- Injuries: 6

The Dengjiatun Incident was a conflict that broke out between Chinese and Japanese forces in August 1916 during the Republican era of China in the eponymous town of Dengjiatun, Liaobei province (now part of Shuangliao, Jilin province). It led to the deaths of 12 Japanese citizens and 4 Chinese citizens, and resulted in a Chinese apology to Japan.

== Background ==
In 1905, the Japanese and Chinese Qing governments signed a treaty (Chinese name: 中日会议东三省事宜条约, Japanese name: 滿洲善後条約) conferring the right for military occupation of the South Manchuria Railway from the Russian Empire to the Japanese. In August 1904, Japanese troops entered the city of Dengjiatun under the pretense of having been accidentally attacked by Chinese policemen while the Japanese troops were undergoing military training nearby. Despite protests from the Chinese government, the Japanese military continued to occupy Dengjiatun.

In 1916, in the midst of the National Protection War, Mongol prince Babojab launched an attempt for Manchu and Mongol independence. Babojab entered Inner Mongolia with his troops but was defeated by Fengtian Army general Wu Junsheng. With more than 500 of his troops killed, Babojab retreated from the area, and Fengtian warlord Zhang Zuolin reinforced nearby Liaoyuan county, where Dengjiatun was located, with the 28th Division of the Fengtian Army.

== Events ==
According to some accounts, on August 13, 1916, a Chinese child was eating watermelon in Dengjiatun when he accidentally flicked some seeds onto the clothes of Japanese merchant Kishimoto Kiyokishi (Japanese: 吉本喜代吉), who then beat the child in anger. Other accounts claim that a child was selling fish for 30 dollars, and Kishimoto insisted on buying the fish for 10 dollars, leading to him beating the child when the child refused. (Note: A politician working for Gotō Shinpei, Kamezō Nishihara, commented on the incident that it was common at the time for Japanese expats to enforce unfair transactions) A Fengtian soldier in the 28th Division saw this and got into a scuffle with Kishimoto. The crowd that gathered around assisted the Chinese soldier, and Kishimoto went to the Japanese police to file a report after being badly beaten. A Japanese policeman Kawase, upon finding nobody at the local Chinese police station, went straight to the encampment of the 28th Division to settle the issue. However, the Chinese troops refused to talk, and beat Kawase instead. Kawase then requested assistance from the Japanese troops stationed in the area.

Japanese lieutenant Matsuo Hikoji then lead around 20 troops into the Fengtian encampment demanding to meet the soldier that beat Kishimoto. During the dispute, a Japanese soldier cut off the right hand of a Fengtian soldier, resulting in the break-out of a gunfight. Troops from both sides were wounded and killed, including Kawase the policeman. As the Japanese troops were outnumbered by the 300 or so Chinese troops in the 28th Division, they retreated from the encampment.

Three days later, Japanese reinforcements arrived at the break of dawn and set up 5 cannons outside Dengjiatun. Captain Iue sent a notice to county executive Jing Zhaofeng, demanding Chinese troops to withdraw from the area immediately. After discussion between Jing and the 28th Division, they decided to move the encampment outside the city limits. However, when Jing went to report the decision to the Japanese troops, Iue and the other commanders seized and Jing and did not let him leave. He was only released after trading for Jing's son to use as a hostage.

On August 24, the Japanese troops occupied the former Fengtian barracks, reinforcing their numbers to more than 1500 troops by the end of the month. The Japanese troops then established a consulate and police station.

== Resolution ==
The Beijing government wished for the local Fengtian government to handle the affair, but the Japanese government demanded to negotiate with the Beijing government directly. Talks began with Japanese diplomat Hayashi Gonsuke on August 19, 1916. On September 2, Hayashi listed eight demands to minister Chen Jintao:

1. To severely reprimand 28th Division commander Feng Delin,
2. To severely reprimand the soldiers and officers involved in the incident and demote all officers of the 28th Division,
3. To issue a public apology and command all Northeastern army commanders order their troops to avoid conflict with Japanese troops,
4. To acknowledge Japan's right to station police and consultants in Southern Manchuria,
5. To hire Japanese military consultants in Chinese armies while in Southern Manchuria and Inner Mongolia,
6. To hire Japanese military instructors,
7. To compensate Japanese victims or the relatives of the dead,
8. To dispatch the military-governor of Fengtian to apologize in-person to Japanese colonial administrators.

After the fifth and sixth demands were removed, the Beijing government accepted the demands in January 1917, demoting the division commander, punishing involved officers, compensating Kishimoto with 500 yuan, issuing a notice to treat Japanese citizens politely, and sending the Fengtian military-governor to apologize to the Kantou Toufuku administrator and the Consul General stationed in Fengtian.

On April 14, 1917, Japanese troops left Dengjiatun.

== Consequences ==
Because Chinese troops retreated from Dengjiatun, the plan to encircle Babojab's forces fell through. Under the support of Japanese troops, Babojab's Manchu and Mongol forces switched into Japanese military uniforms and detonated the Raoyang River bridge, cutting off the Fengtian troops from pursuing them.

The incident also played a role in changing Japanese policy towards China. The Japanese government ended their support of the Royalist Party in favor of Zhang Zuolin. Feng Delin, the reprimanded 28th Division commander, began to step away from military affairs. In 1917, after a failed bid to support warlord Zhang Xun's Manchu Restoration, Feng retired to become a businessman.
