= List of British corps in the First World War =

List of military corps — List of British corps in the First World War

This is a list of British army corps that existed during the First World War. Most of the corps operated on the Western Front.

== Infantry ==
- I Corps – original BEF
- II Corps – original BEF
- III Corps – formed in France 1914
- IV Corps – formed in Belgium 1914, transferred to BEF
- V Corps – formed in France 1915
- VI Corps – formed in France 1915
- VII Corps – formed in France 1915
- VIII Corps – formed in Gallipoli 1915, moved to France
- IX Corps – formed in Gallipoli 1915, moved to France
- X Corps – formed in France 1915
- XI Corps – formed in France 1915, moved to Italy 1917
- XII Corps – formed in France 1915, moved to Salonika
- XIII Corps – formed in France 1915
- XIV Corps – formed in France 1916, moved to Italy 1917
- XV Corps – formed in Egypt 1915, reformed in France 1916
- XVI Corps – formed in Salonika 1916
- XVII Corps – formed in France 1916
- XVIII Corps – formed in France 1917
- XIX Corps – formed in France 1917
- XX Corps – formed in Palestine 1917
- XXI Corps – formed in Palestine 1917
- XXII Corps – formed in France 1917
- XXIII Corps – formed in England 1918

== Cavalry/Mounted ==
- Cavalry Corps
- Desert Mounted Corps - formed in Palestine

== See also ==
- Egyptian Camel Transport Corps
- Indian Labour Corps
- Macedonian Mule Corps
- Chinese Labour Corps
- Maltese Labour Corps
- Imperial Camel Corps
- Labour Corps
- Lists of World War I topics
- List of British corps in World War II
