= Fijian Labour Corps =

Non-combatant military unit

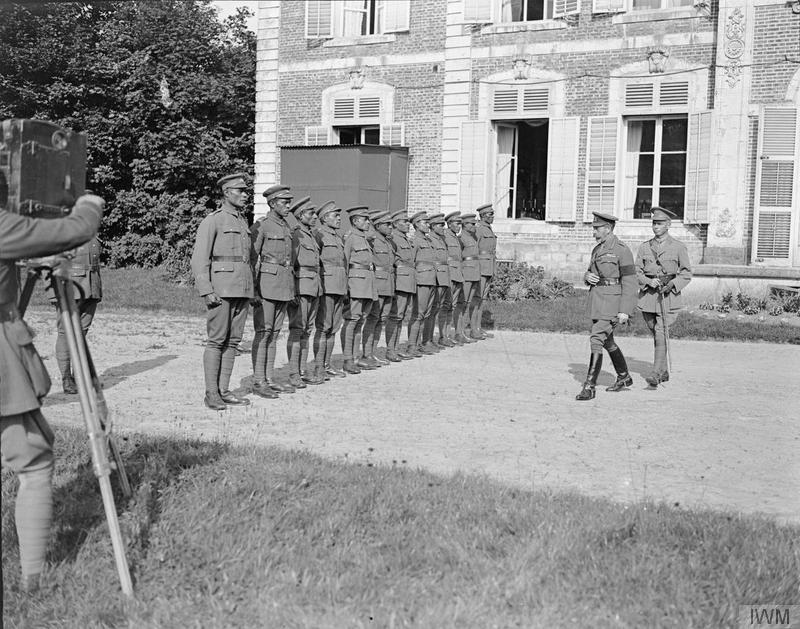
King George V inspecting troops of the Fiji Labour Corps at Tramecourt Chateau, 13 August 1918. He is accompanied by the unit's commander, Captain Kenneth Allardyce.

The Fijian Labour Corps (sometimes referred to as the Fiji Labour Corps) was a labour corps unit raised in Fiji that served alongside British Empire forces in the First and Second World Wars. The unit was first formed in 1917 at the proposal of Lala Sukuna, the son of a Fijian chief who had been rejected for service in the British Army on account of his race. The 101-strong unit initially served to support the Western Front providing labour at Calais and Marseilles and worked in Taranto, Italy, after the end of the war. The unit completed its service in 1919 and returned to Fiji. Twelve members of the unit died during the war.

During the Second World War, the unit was re-established in 1942 and served in the Pacific War. This incarnation of the Fijian Labour Corps was much larger, amounting to two battalions and two independent companies. They worked to unload vessels and construct and maintain military facilities, including with the Americans on Bougainville Island. Some 3,000 men served in the unit during the war, of which 29 died. One member received the British Empire Medal for bravery while salvaging cargo from an American ship. The unit was disbanded in 1948.

== First World War ==
=== Background and formation ===
Fiji had been a colony of Great Britain since 1874. After the outbreak of the First World War in 1914, white residents of the colony were permitted to serve in combat roles. The first contingent of men arrived on the Western Front the following year, serving as a platoon of the King's Royal Rifle Corps; other contingents followed later. Indigenous Fijians were not permitted to serve with the British government as they were concerned about the recent decline of the indigenous population due to disease. Lala Sukuna, the son of a Fijian chief, was studying law at the University of Oxford when war broke out. He applied to serve with the British Army but was turned down because of his race. He instead enlisted in the French Foreign Legion where he served with distinction and received the Médaille militaire. He left the force after being wounded and returned to Fiji in 1916.

Sukuna proposed that Fijians be allowed to serve in a non-combatant labour unit and this offer was accepted by the British government in 1917. The unit consisted of 101 men. The officers and non-commissioned officers were all white except for Sukuna who served as quarter-master sergeant (despite already holding the higher rank of second lieutenant in the Fiji Defence Force). Their original uniform was a tunic with a sulu kilt and no headwear, though photographs of a detachment being inspected by George V in August 1918 show them in more standard British Army puttees, trousers and caps. The commanding officer of the unit throughout its existence was Kenneth Allardyce, formerly of the Fiji Civil Service, who received the temporary rank of lieutenant and the acting rank of captain.

=== Service and legacy ===
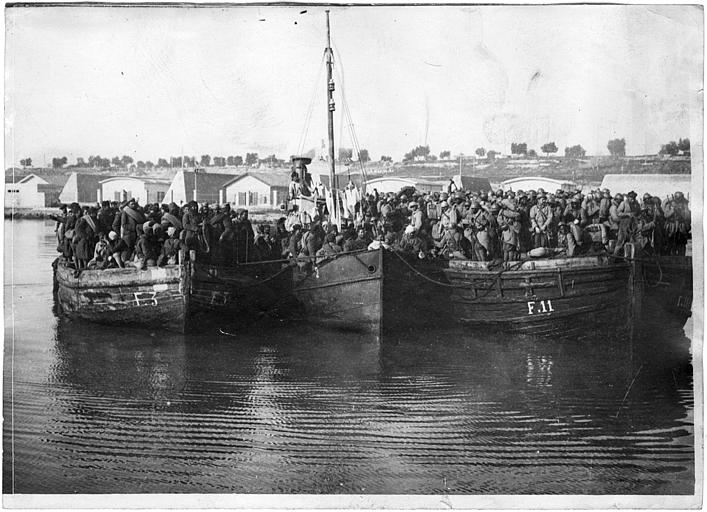
French troops embarking at Taranto, 1919

Henry Marks, a significant local businessman and politician, paid £10,000 to cover the fares for the men to travel to Europe and to fund separation allowances for their families. The unit left Fiji on 19 May 1917 and travelled via Honolulu, Vancouver and Liverpool on their journey to France, which they reached in early July. The unit was initially housed at a camp near Calais, surrounded by barbed wire. The wire was later removed as the men proved themselves loyal and efficient workers. The Fijian members of the unit attracted much attention from other soldiers for their height, traditional hairstyles and muscular build. One member of the unit died on 1 January 1918 and is buried in Les Baraques Military Cemetery, Sangatte. Later that month the unit was moved to Marseille to work at the docks there. Members of the force suffered from pneumonia and influenza, with five dying between February and December; they were buried in Mazargues War Cemetery, Marseilles. One member who died in February 1919 is buried at O'Neill's Point Cemetery in Auckland, New Zealand.

After the armistice of 11 November 1918, the Fijian Labour Corps served in Taranto, Italy. There was a shortage of labour in the city and attempts to use members of the British West Indies Regiment as labourers in December 1918 led to a mutiny. Three members of the Fijian Labour Corps died between May and July 1919 and are buried in the Taranto Town Cemetery Extension. Later that year, the unit returned to Fiji, with Allardyce relinquishing his commission on 15 September 1919 upon completion of service. Nine days later, during their return to Fiji, one member of the Fijian Labour Corps died on board the MTS Kia Ora and was buried at sea in the Atlantic Ocean. He is remembered in the United Kingdom Book of Remembrance. The unit arrived at Suva on 31 October 1919. One further member died on 27 December 1919 and was buried in Suva Old Cemetery; all further members survived until the end of the war on 31 August 1921.

Around 1,255 people from Fiji and surrounding islands served in some capacity during the war, including the 101 with the Fijian Labour Corps and 357 in the King's Royal Rifle Corps; 173 died. The service given by members of the Fijian Labour Corps was recognised with the award of a Loyalty Cross badge by the colonial government. Edward, Prince of Wales met former members of the Fijian Labour Corps in Fiji during his 1921–22 tour of the Pacific. A commemoration service for the members of the First World War unit was held at the National War Memorial at Veiuto on 19 May 2015, led by President Ratu Epeli Nailatikau.

== Second World War ==
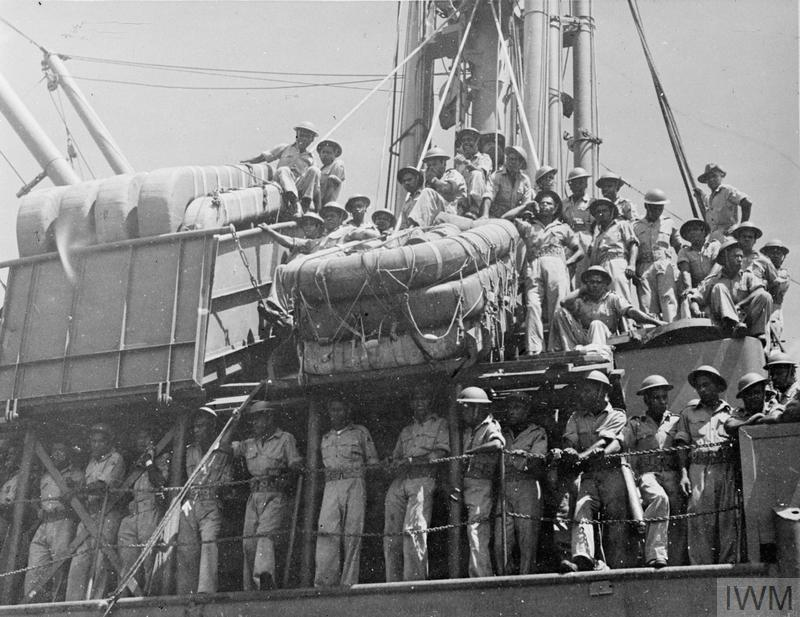
Fijian Labour Corps personnel on return to Suva after service in the Solomon Islands, 1945.

After the December 1941 Japanese declaration of war on the United States and the British Empire, the Pacific became an important theatre of the Second World War and the Fijian Labour Corps was re-established. The 1st Battalion of the Fiji Labour Corps was formed by command of the governor of Fiji on 1 October 1942. By the end of 1942, 1,375 men had enlisted in the Fijian Labour Corps. It was much larger than it had been in the previous war, consisting of two battalions and two independent dock companies. The units served on Fiji and elsewhere in the Pacific unloading vessels and building and maintaining military facilities. The 1st Battalion was responsible for unloading 582 vessels by the war's end in 1945. One of the independent companies was deployed to Torokina, Bougainville Island, in Papua New Guinea where they served as stevedores to help supply the nearby Torokina Airfield.

One member of the Fijian Labour Corps, Private Ramelusi Druma, won the British Empire Medal in December 1942 for bravery during his work as a winchman while salvaging cargo from a wrecked US ship. While Druma was unloading the cargo, a heavy motor lorry, it swung loose. He remained at the winch, dodging the vehicle each time it swung past him until it was safely landed. In 1943, a call for 1,000 volunteers from the men of Indian background on Fiji was opposed by the Colonial Sugar Refining Company who wanted them to remain on the farms and only 331 enlisted. This was sufficient to form a company that served on Fiji.

Of the 11,000 people from Fiji who served in the war in some capacity, 3,000 served with the Fijian Labour Corps. The unit suffered 29 fatalities during the war, of whom 15 are buried in cemeteries in Suva and the rest have no known grave and are commemorated on the Suva Memorial to the missing. Among those killed was Lieutenant Ratu Jovesa Tagiveitaua, a corporal, and 27 privates. The Fijian Labour Corps was disbanded in 1948.

== See also ==
- Chinese Labour Corps
- Egyptian Labour Corps
- Indian Labour Corps
- Maltese Labour Corps
- South African Native Labour Corps
