= Labour corps (disambiguation) =

Labour corps or labor corps may refer to:

- Labour Corps (British Army), a branch within the British Army during the First World War, a forerunner of the Royal Pioneer Corps
- Chinese Labour Corps or Corps de Travailleurs Chinois, civilian auxiliaries of the British and French militaries during the First World War
- Egyptian Labour Corps, a civilian auxiliary of the British military during the First World War
- Indian Labour Corps, unit of the First World War that supported the British military
- Maltese Labour Corps, unit of the First World War that supported the British military
- South African Native Labour Corps, unit of the First World War that supported the British military
- Solomon Islands Labour Corps, a civilian auxiliary of the British Solomon Islands Protectorate Defence Force during the Second World War
- Vanuatu Labor Corps, a civilian auxiliary consisting of New Hebrides natives which supported the American Army and Navy during the Second World War
