= Lists of World War I topics =

This is a list of World War I-related lists:

- Bibliography of World War I
- Indian Army during World War I order of battle
- Ireland and World War I
- List of ambulance drivers during World War I
- List of Australian corps in World War I
- List of Australian divisions in World War I
- List of books on military executions in World War I
- List of British armies in the First World War
- List of British corps in the First World War
- List of British divisions in the First World War
- List of Canadian soldiers executed for military offences
- List of combat vehicles of World War I
- List of German weapons of World War I
- List of last surviving World War I veterans
- List of Medal of Honor recipients for World War I
- List of military engagements of World War I
- List of national border changes (1914–present)
- List of New Zealand soldiers executed during World War I
- List of Polish divisions in World War I
- List of Welsh Victoria Cross recipients of World War I
- List of World War I video games
- Lists of World War I flying aces
