= Labor army (disambiguation) =

Labor army is a term used in 1920 to describe Soviet soldiers who were moved from military jobs to physical labor jobs.

Labor army or Labor Army may also refer to:

- Informal reference to NKVD labor columns, Soviet Union, 1941–1946
- Reserve army of labour, a term invented by Karl Marx about the unemployed and under-employed in capitalist society

== See also ==
- Labour corps (disambiguation)
- Labour battalion
