= Lists of military corps =

The article provides links to lists of military corps arranged by ordinal number, name, country or conflict.

== By number ==
- I Corps
- II Corps
- III Corps
- IV Corps
- V Corps
- VI Corps
- VII Corps
- VIII Corps
- IX Corps
- X Corps
- XI Corps
- XII Corps
- XIII Corps
- XIV Corps
- XV Corps
- XVI Corps
- XVII Corps
- XVIII Corps
- XIX Corps
- XX Corps
- XXI Corps
- XXII Corps
- XXIII Corps
- XXIV Corps
- XXV Corps
- XXVI Corps
- XXVII Corps
- XXVIII Corps
- XXIX Corps
- XXX Corps

== By conflict ==
- List of British corps in World War I
- List of British corps in World War II
- List of Finnish corps in the Winter War
- List of Finnish corps in the Continuation War
- List of German corps in World War II
- List of corps of the United States
