= Kenneth Allardyce =

British colonial administrator in Fiji

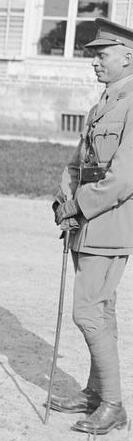
- Allardyce in 1918 as commander of the Fijian Labour Corps

Secretary for Native Affairs
- In office –1920

Official Member of the Legislative Council
- In office 1914–1920

Personal details
- Born: 9 April 1881; Aberdeen, United Kingdom
- Died: 14 April 1937 (aged 56); Nabavatu, Fiji
- Profession: Colonial administrator

Kenneth James Allardyce MBE (9 April 1881 – 14 April 1937) was a British colonial administrator in Fiji.

== Biography ==
Allardyce was born in Aberdeen in 1881, and was educated at Aberdeen Grammar School and Wellington College. He joined his brother William in Fiji in 1898 and became a member of the civil service, starting as a clerk. In 1902 he was made chief clerk and inspector. He later became a District Commissioner in Lomaiviti, then Native Commissioner in 1914. Shortly after becoming Native Commissioner, he was appointed to the Legislative Council. He subsequently became Secretary for Native Affairs.

During World War I he headed the Fiji Labour Corps, attaining the rank of captain. He was subsequently awarded an MBE for his service.

After retiring from the civil service in 1920, he became a coconut planter. He was sent to the Solomon Islands in 1922 as a special commissioner to investigate labour conditions. He also briefly returned to the civil service as Acting District Commissioner in Lau and Resident Commissioner in Rotuma. He died in 1937.
