= Maltese Labour Corps =

- October 1917 poster calling for recruits to form the 2nd battalion
- Active: August 1915 – after May 1920
- Country: Malta
- Allegiance: British Empire
- Branch: Army
- Type: Labour
- Role: Support
- Size: 2 battalions, 3 independent companies
- Engagements: Gallipoli campaign, Macedonian front

The Maltese Labour Corps (MLC) was a labour unit raised in Malta during the First World War to support the British Army. It comprised two battalions of labourers and stevedores; two companies of cooks, waiters, and servants; and a company of miners. The units served at Gallipoli, Salonika, Italy, and in Turkey (after the armistice). There may have been a further independent labour company that served in Malta. Many of the units' commanding officers were drawn from the King's Own Royal Malta Regiment of Militia. More than 5,000 men served in the corps, with members receiving the British War Medal in bronze. In the course of their service 124 members died, at least one killed in action with many of the remainder dying during the Spanish Flu pandemic of 1918.

== First Battalion ==
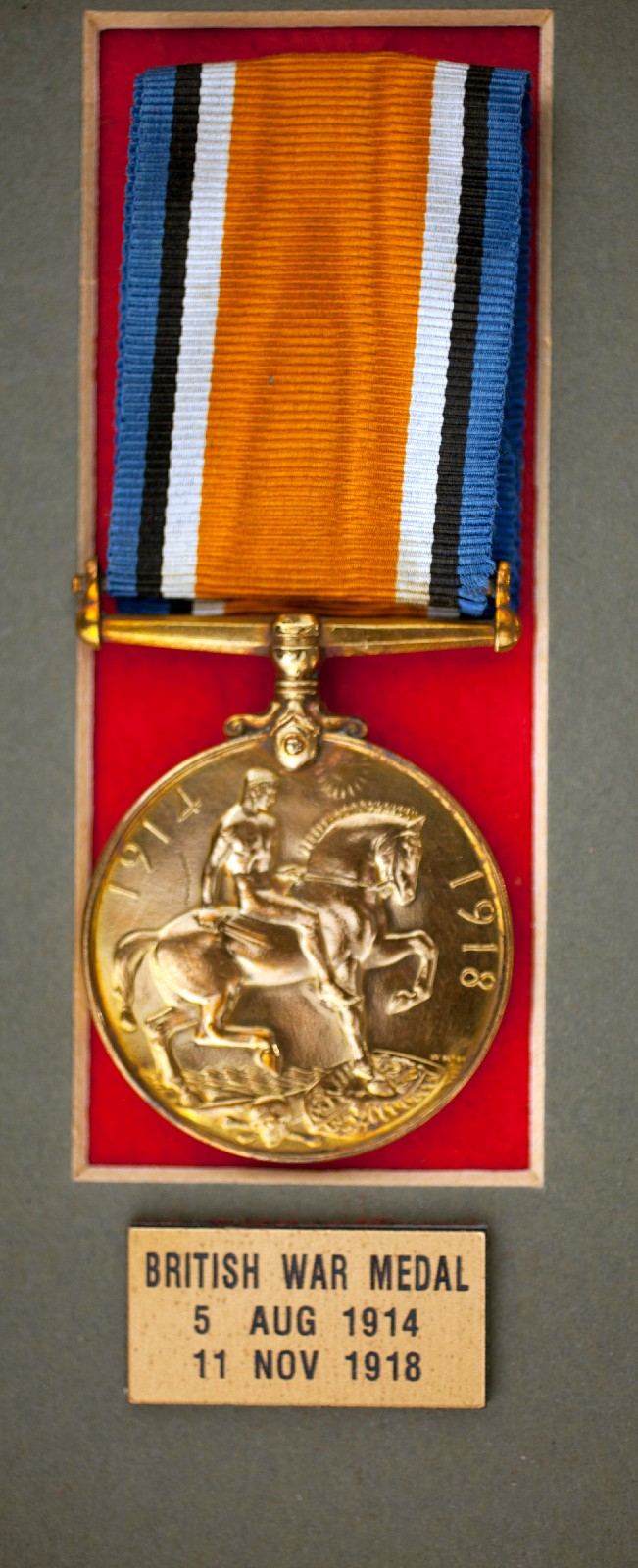
Men who served in the Maltese Labour Corps were awarded British War Medals in bronze

In August 1915, there was a request for 750 volunteers from Malta to form a labour battalion for service with the British Army. More than 1,000 applied and by the start of September 864 of these had been selected. The excellent rate of pay (2 shillings 6 pence per day, plus 6 pence a day if married and one penny for each child) and flexible 3-month contract was very attractive. The men were allocated roles as labourers, drivers, and stevedores and placed under the command of Major JV Aspinall of the King's Own Royal Malta Regiment of Militia. Many of the unit's other 14 officers were also drawn from the island's militia.

The unit served at Mudros, a Greek port being used to support the Gallipoli Campaign from September 1915. Some 234 men volunteered to serve close to the front at Gallipoli as stevedores. These were accompanied by a quartermaster, sergeant, corporal and five men from the Malta Corps of the St John Ambulance Brigade and three Roman Catholic chaplains. The unit suffered one man killed in action and two slightly wounded.

The men at Gallipoli returned to Malta on 28 November and the members were encouraged to sign new contracts. Captain FM Stivala (attached from the militia) of the unit was mentioned in dispatches whilst Second Lieutenant Henry Curmi and Lieutenant AG Dandria also received praise for their actions. The corps was said to have performed well under Turkish shellfire. The unit worked closely with the ANZAC forces during the campaign and two of the officers who led the MLC at Gallipoli later served as Maltese commissioners to Australia.

The remainder of the battalion at Mudros returned to Malta on 17 February 1916. Major-General Walter Campbell, on behalf of the Mediterranean Expeditionary Force, wrote to the Governor and Commander-in-Chief, Malta (Paul Methuen, 3rd Baron Methuen) that "I have much pleasure in informing you that the Battalion performed most excellent work, both at ANZAC and elsewhere, and I shall be grateful if you will be good enough to express to the Commanding Officer, and through him to the NCOs and men of the Battalion, my high appreciation of the services they have rendered".

In 1916, the British Salonika Army was formed to support the Serbian Army fighting German, Austrian and Bulgarian forces on the Macedonian front and to resist the Bulgarian invasion of Greece. In August, it was decided to reform the 1st Battalion MLC to serve in this theatre. The unit, under Major S. Samut-Tagliaferro (from the militia) and comprising a dispenser, six hospital orderlies, 502 labourers, and 307 stevedores, arrived in Salonika on 26 September 1916 and established themselves at the Ordnance Depot. A further 216 men arrived in October. All of the British Army's supplies had to be transported by boat and landed at Salonika whereas the Central Powers could make use of shorter overland supply routes.

The 1st battalion MLC is believed to have assisted in the construction of two new deep-water piers near the Standard Oil Depot, these being known as Malta Pier and Pinto Pier. The 1st Battalion remained in Salonika beyond the initially intended 9-month period and it is believed that many of its personnel re-engaged there for further duties. The unit served outside of Salonika on the lines of communication and suffered 49 deaths during the deployment.

== Second Battalion ==
In October 1917 a call was made for 750 recruits to form a 2nd Battalion of the corps on a 6-month contract with a 3-month re-engagement. Recruitment took place between 23 and 16 October, primarily on the less developed island of Gozo as farming skills were in high demand in Salonika. The unit was due to leave for Italy on 20 October but a shortage of transport caused a delay and the unit's members were returned home. The opportunity was taken to recruit a further 250 volunteers, and the reinforced unit left for Salonika on 5 December under the command of Major F Stivala of the Maltese militia. The battalion was attached to XVI Corps with smaller detachments serving with XII Corps and others placed on separate agriculture and anti-malaria duties.

The 2nd Battalion headquarters was established at Janes with detachments working at Causica, Snevkem Guguni, Saraklu and Salsamani. Around 100 men worked on the Decauville Railway with many of the remainder assisting with the loading and unloading of stores for the Royal Engineers. To provide replacements for those men returning home at the end of their contract who chose not to re-engage, a further recruitment of 926 labourers from Malta and Gozo was authorised in May 1918. Three men of the 2nd Battalion died on active service prior to February 1918.

== Independent companies ==
Following the entry of Italy into the war as an ally in May 1915 the Royal Navy began to use the port at Taranto, an important logistics link between Southern France, Northern Italy and the Mediterranean ports. The city was also used after November 1917 as a base and a rest camp for British and Commonwealth forces. The MLC, recognised as the best of the foreign-raised labour units, was asked to provide detachments from both battalions to man the docks at Taranto from spring 1918.

Additional companies were raised for service in Salonika. On 9 February 1918 a new unit, the 1st Employment Company was raised. This comprised 14 cooks, 42 waiters, 63 servants, two corporals, and three sergeants commanded by Acting Captain Charles F Von Brockdorff. Arriving in Salonika on 23 February 1918, a further 18 waiters, 100 servants, three NCOs and an officer joined the unit on 10 March to bring it up to full strength. The 2nd Employment Company was later raised, arriving in Salonika in September 1918 and comprising 200 men under 19-year-old Acting Captain W L Bonello. The employment companies saw service in Turkey (including at Constantinople) and the Black Sea Region after the armistice. One unit remained in the area until at least May 1920, when it was possibly based near the Russian border.

A mining company was also started, serving at Montecchio Precalcino and Treviso in Northern Italy under the command of King's Own Royal Malta Regiment of Militia officer Lieutenant Frank Gollcher, KOMRM. Two members of this unit died of disease in Italy. Another labour company seems to have served in Malta.

== Legacy ==
Around 5,621 volunteers served in the Maltese Labour Corps, with each veteran receiving the British War Medal in bronze. There were 124 men killed in service during the war, forming a large proportion of the 592 total Maltese deaths in the war. Of those that died at least 52 were serving with the 1st Battalion, 41 with the 2nd Battalion, 8 with the 1st Employment Company, 3 with the 2nd Employment Company and 2 with the Mining Company. The dead were named on a stone cross at the War Memorial in Floriana, Malta but this was removed at some point after the Second World War and the monument rededicated to the dead of that war also. Disease was the main cause of death, with many potentially dying during the Spanish Flu pandemic of 1918. In addition to the death at Gallipoli, another man may have been killed in action in Turkey after the end of the war.

== See also ==
- Chinese Labour Corps
- Indian Labour Corps
- South African Native Labour Corps
- Egyptian Labour Corps
- Fijian Labour Corps
