= South African Native Labour Corps =

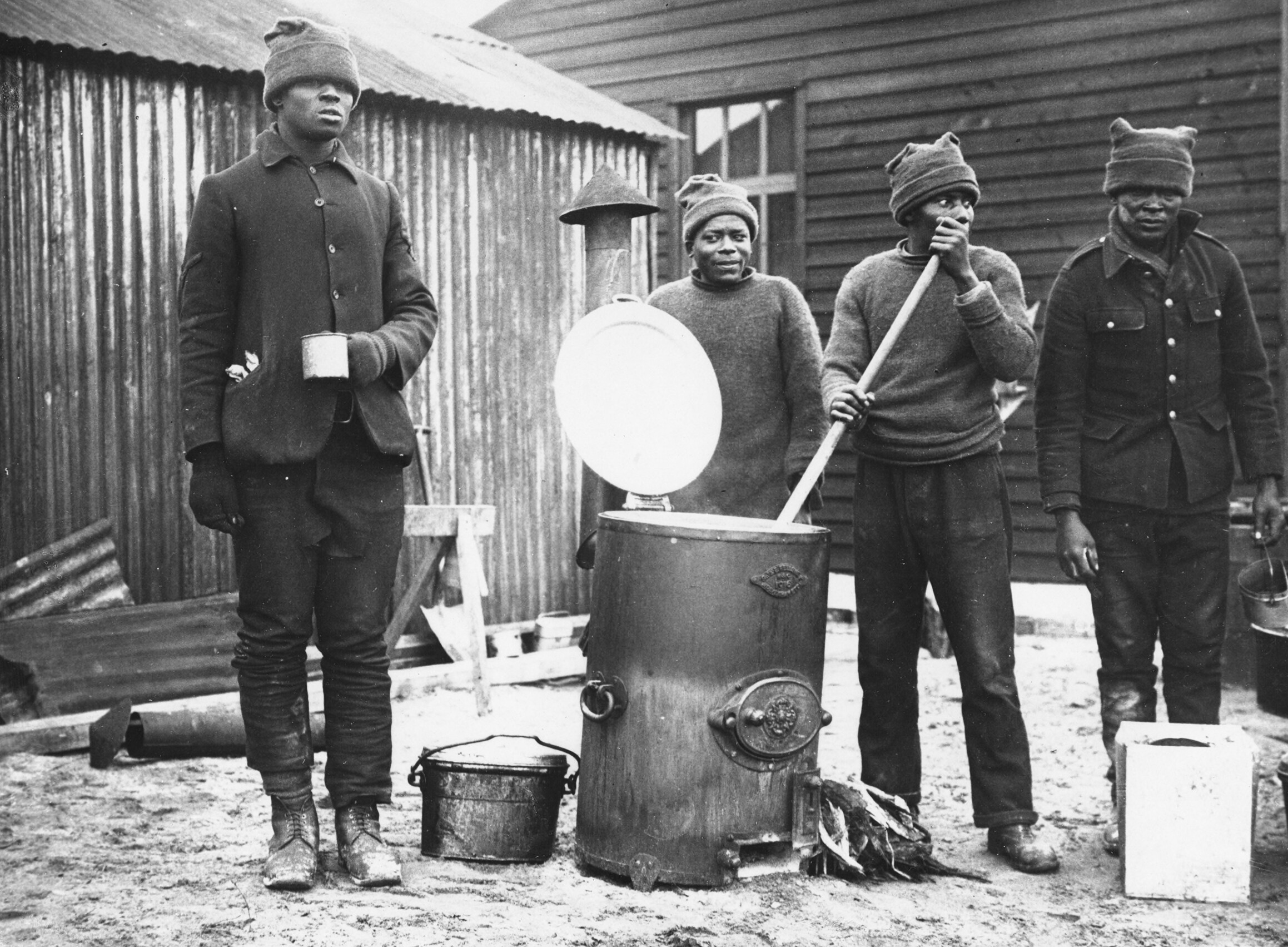
- Men, probably of the South African Native Labour Corps, cooking on a Soyer stove in a hutted camp on the Western Front, c.1917
- Active: 1916 – January 1918
- Country: South Africa
- Allegiance: South African Army

Commanders
- Notable commanders: Colonel S.A.M. Pritchard

The South African Native Labour Corps (SANLC) was a force of workers formed in 1916 in response to a British request for workers at French ports. About 25,000 South Africans joined the Corps. The SANLC was utilized in various menial noncombat tasks. The SANLC was disbanded by the South African government in January 1918.

== Background ==
The South African Native Labour Corps or Contingent has its origins in a plan by the Imperial War Cabinet to employ labour from South Africa and other Commonwealth nations to relieve the shortage of labour at the front and at French ports as ship shortages required that ships be unloaded and returned to transport duties as quickly as possible. About 25,000 South Africans were to be recruited, of whom 21,000 were transported via requisitioned merchant steamships to France. The first two companies arrived in France on 20 November 1916 and the last group of men left France on 5 January 1918. Prime Minister Louis Botha, also Minister of Native Affairs, was involved in the negotiations with the British and ensured that the recruits would have no combat role, with work behind the front lines at ports, through railway, quarrying work and forestry. The South African government wanted to ensure that no black man fought together with a white man on equal terms as this would break down the colour bar between the races leading to the contamination of social and political relations. This had implications for the working class in South Africa as a labour division was required between the two races.

== Recruitment process ==
The South African parliament did not have to approve the formation of the SANLC as all costs were paid by the British government. Recruitment began during September 1916 with a plan to recruit 10,000 black recruits to form five battalions of 2,000 men with 63 officers and NCOs. Their contract would be for one year with the possibility of renewal with a monthly payment of £3 which was said to be about ten percent more than normal labour payments, and was in fact a greater rate of pay than combatant soldiers at that time. The initial recruitment plans' labour requirement was met by January 1917. The recruitment process was carried out via Native Commissioners, magistrates, recruitment meetings and the clergy and later using members of the educated black elite in South Africa who believed this would demonstrate loyalty to the King and this effort could be used to negotiate political rights at a later date. Solomon Plaatje of the South African Native National Congress would assist in the recruitment process during late 1917. By mid-1917, recruitment had slowed and the use of payments to black chiefs and recruiting agents were used to increase the recruitment targets.

== Opposition ==
In addition to the South African government's attempt to manage the use of these recruits, opposition to the recruitment of black men to the SANLC came from many quarters of South African society. The Chamber of Mines was concerned about the loss of labour required to run their gold mines, with the possibility of increased wages if scarcity occurred. White farmers also feared the loss of cheap labour and used intimidation to keep the labour on the farms by suggesting the loss of men's homes on these properties. Prominent South African politician John X. Merriman opposed the recruitment, fearing what would happen to society on the return of these men after introducing them to European social conditions. There was also black opposition to the recruitment process. Due to the implementation of the Native land Act of 1913, there was a fear that land owned by the recruits could be taken from them during their absence overseas and result in the eviction of their families. Superstition also played a part in the opposition, with many black people fearing that one could not cross the seas and return alive.

== Deployment ==
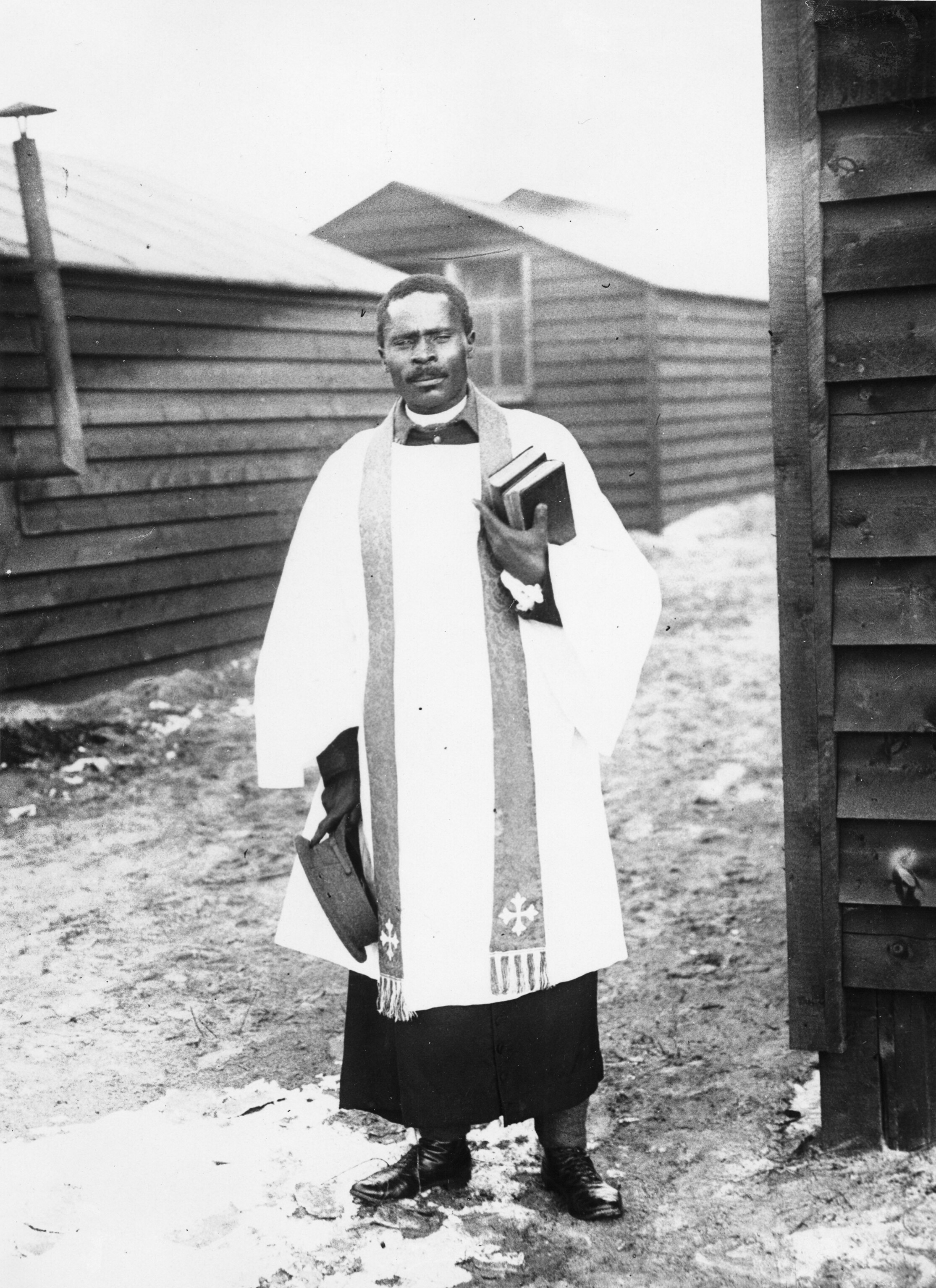
South African priest, Bishop Lazarus Khumalo on the Western Front. He wears what seem to be Church of England vestments over army uniform. He is standing in a camp of wooden huts, probably one of the camps of the South African Native Labour Corps (National Library of Scotland 4687906729)

Colonel S.A.M. Pitchard, a member of the Native Affairs Department, was appointed as Officer Commanding the South African Native Labour Corps and arrived in France in October 1916 before the first battalion of 2000 men arrived in November. He was under orders to maintain South African control over the SANLC, with their own white officers, ensuring their segregation from French society and in compounds, not on the front and control the job choices allocated to the men. The aim of this strict control was to reduce the men's access to other social conditions, the influence of the ideas of trade unionism and lastly work conditions as they did more hours of work than other labour units. During December 1916, the British government formed the Directorate of Labour to manage all the labour units from Commonwealth nations and begun to break the battalions into smaller units which begun to break down the South African government's strict control over them with some ending up close to the front lines. The last men of the first batch of 10,000, the men of 5th Battalion, arrived on 19 February 1917. By April 1917, the South Africans had managed to withdraw the men from the front to the northern French towns of Le Havre, Rouen, Dieppe, Rouxesnil, Saigneville and Dannes. After the sinking of the transport ship SS Mendi with loss of over 600 members of SANLC, the House of Assembly passed a motion of sympathy to the relatives of the dead. In January 1917 the South African government had hoped the scheme would raise the numbers in the SANLC to 50,000 as there was still labour shortages on the front but it was not to be and by May 1918, all men were home. The South African government expressed the reason for the return was a military issue, but most believe that the reason was political as the government was coming under pressure from the opposition who had expressed its concerns for the scheme. In reality, the majority were repatriated on the expiration of their contracts, a year after enlistment. Prior to departure the men were sent to a camp near Devonport where they were roundly cheered by the local inhabitants as 'gallant forces of the Empire'. The excellent service by the men of the SANLC was also acknowledged by Douglas Haig, Commander in Chief of the British Army, who expressed his appreciation for their contributions.

== Casualties ==
The Commonwealth War Graves Commission records 1,304 deaths for the South African Native Labour Corps whose graves and memorials are found mostly in the United Kingdom, France and South Africa. Thirteen black servicemen were killed by their officers and NCOs when they mutinied over the imprisonment of a colleague, though this incident was suppressed by the South African government. Another 331 died in France of medical reasons, probably tuberculosis. Lastly, 607 black servicemen and nine white officers or NCOs died when the ship SS Mendi sank in a collision with another ship in the English Channel.

== War decorations ==
The South African government issued no war service medal to the black servicemen and the special medal issued by King George V to the troops that served the Empire (the British War Medal) was disallowed and not issued to the SANLC by the South African government. However, the British War Medal was issued to men recruited from areas under direct British control, Basutoland, Bechuanaland and Swaziland. A further five or six men were additionally awarded the Meritorious Service Medal. It was also said that any compensation scheme issued to servicemen by the South African government was said to be unfair.

== See also ==
- Chinese Labour Corps
- Egyptian Labour Corps
- Indian Labour Corps
- Maltese Labour Corps
- SS Mendi
