= Indian Labour Corps =

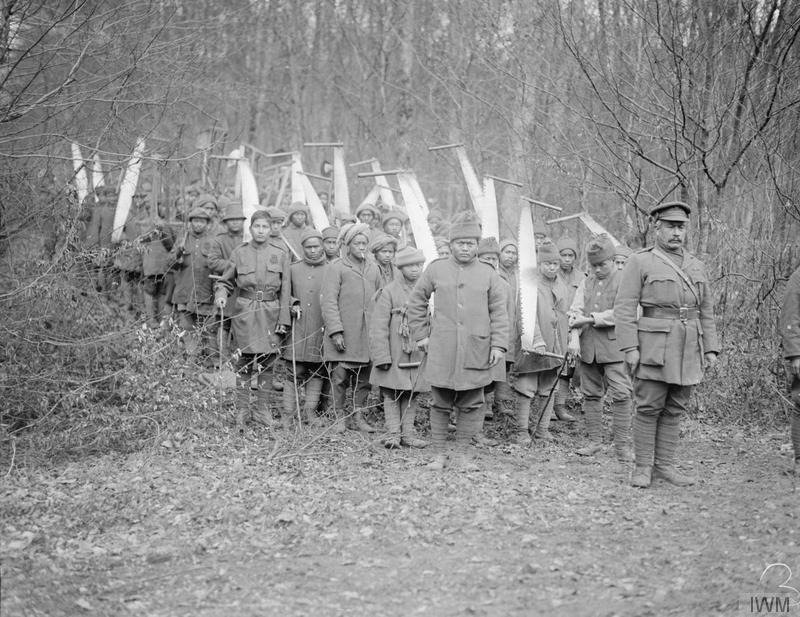
- Indian Labour Corps workers in France during January 1918
- Active: 1915–1921
- Country: British Raj
- Type: Construction
- Engagements: World War I

The Indian Labour Corps was a labour corps recruited from the British Raj during World War I. Recruitment began on a voluntary basis in 1915, but by 1917 the British Government was requiring that localities provide quotas of men. The corps undertook construction duties around the world during the war with the workers frequently enduring difficult conditions. It was disbanded in 1921.

== History ==
Prior to World War I, the British Indian Army regularly used 'Coolie Corps' to support its operations within the Raj and overseas. During World War I, similar formations were raised as the Indian Labour Corps (ILC) and the Porter Corps (PC). Members of the ILC and PC were enlisted under the terms of the Indian Army Act.

Two ILC units were raised in 1915 to participate in the Gallipoli Campaign. They were diverted to support the Mesopotamian Campaign, and other ILC units served in Persia and the Salonika Campaign in Greece.

The British Indian Government agreed in 1917 to send 50,000 ILC workers to France. ILC contingents began arriving there in June that year. Tasks undertaken by the workers in France included digging trenches and building roads, at times within artillery range of German forces.

ILC contingents remained in Mesopotamia and Persia after the war ended.

Workers in ILC units typically endured difficult conditions. These included long hours and hard physical work. Conditions in Mesopotamia were particularly unpleasant.

The ILC was disbanded in 1921. The names of 1,174 men who died while serving with the corps are commemorated on the India Gate memorial in New Delhi.

== Recruitment ==
Recruitment for the ILC and PC was initially undertaken on a voluntary basis, but this failed to produce enough men and the British Government believed that the recruits were not of sufficient quality. In 1916, 16,000 prisoners who were being held in jails were used to form ILC and PC units for service in Mesopotamia. By 1917 recruitment included enforcing quotas on regions. For instance, in 1916 the British authorities demanded that each village in the Naga Hills provide a set number of men for the ILC. The quota policy led to uprisings.

ILC workers were recruited for a fixed period. However, many found it difficult to return to India when this period ended.

== See also ==
- Chinese Labour Corps
- Egyptian Labour Corps
- Labour Corps (British Army)
- Maltese Labour Corps
- South African Native Labour Corps
