= Egyptian Camel Transport Corps =

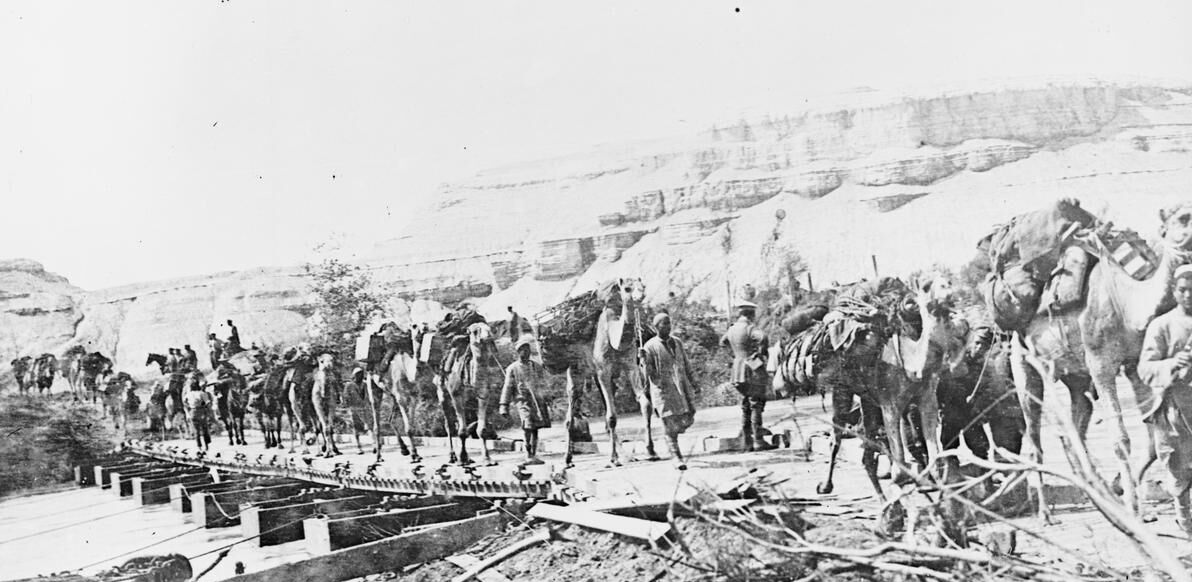
- Units of the Egyptian Camel Transport Corps crossing the Jordan River by the pontoon bridge at Ghoraniyeh in March 1918
- Active: 1914–1918
- Country: Egypt (British Protectorate)
- Allegiance: British Protectorate
- Branch: Army
- Type: Transport
- Role: Supply
- Size: 170,000 camel drivers and 72,500 camels in 2,000-strong companies
- Part of: Force in Egypt
- Casualties: 222 were killed, 1,458 wounded, 4,010 died of disease, 78 went missing, and 66 taken prisoner
- Nickname: ECTC
- Engagements: Sinai and Palestine Campaign: Affair of Jifjafa; Battle of Romani; Battle of Magdhaba; Battle of Rafa; First Battle of Gaza; Second Battle of Gaza; Battle of Beersheba

The Egyptian Camel Transport Corps (known as the CTC, Camel Corps or Camel Transport) were a group of Egyptian camel drivers who supported the British Army in Egypt during the First World War's Sinai and Palestine Campaign. The workers in the Corps contributed to British military operations in the Sinai desert and in Palestine and Syria by transporting supplies to the troops in extreme geographic and weather conditions.

== Formation ==
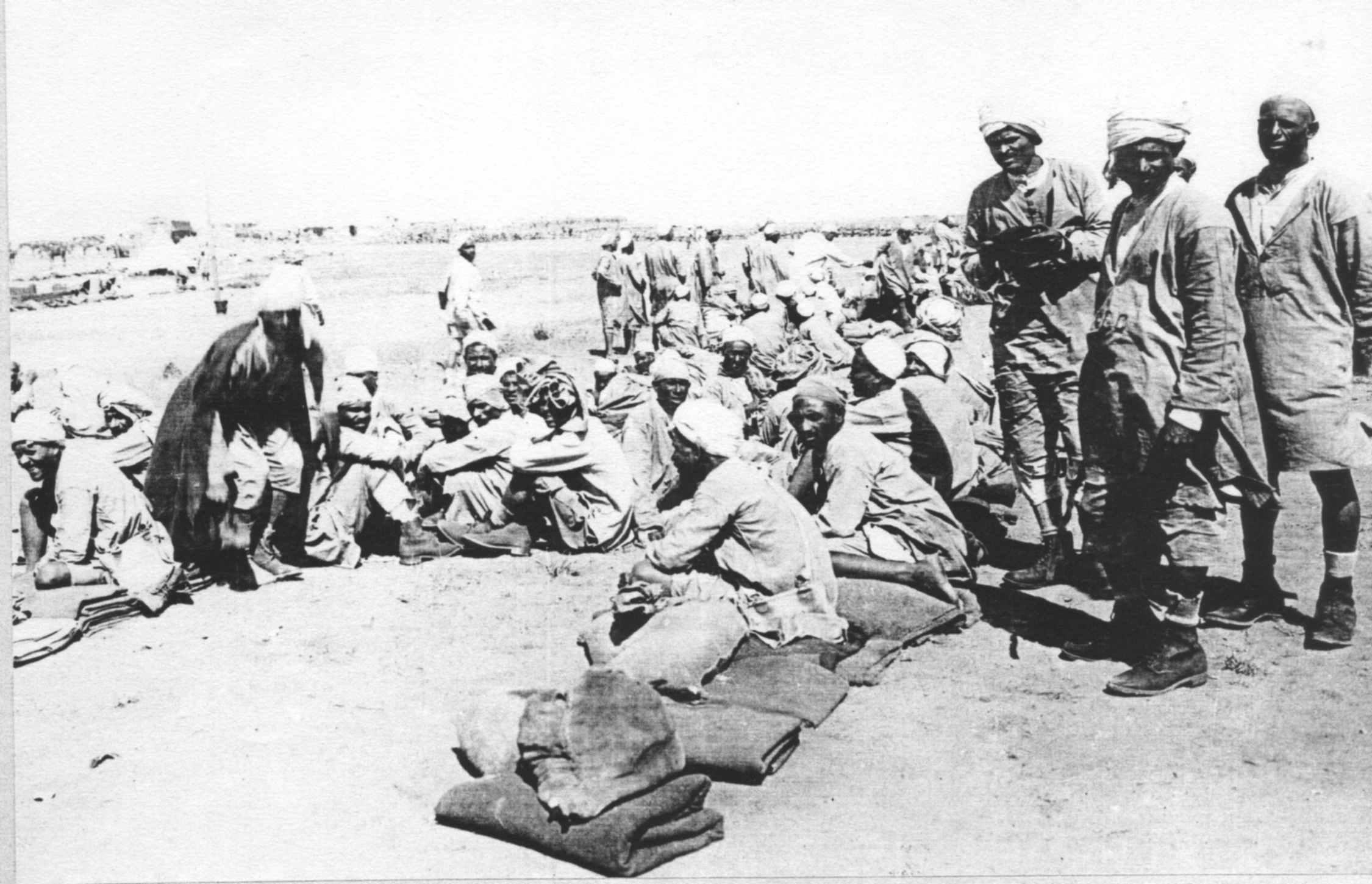
Egyptian Camel Corps personnel. Drivers wearing skyblue Jellabiyas

Britain had occupied Egypt and controlled the Egyptian government after invading the country during the 19th century. At the beginning of the war, Britain set up the Protectorate of Egypt and imposed Martial Law, giving a solemn pledge to defend Egypt and not call on the Egyptian people to aid them in the conflict. However, the British quickly came to realise they desperately needed the support of Egyptian labour, camel drivers and their camels in a land that was so inhospitable to Europeans. The great value of this service was also acknowledged by General Allenby in his Despatch of 16 December 1917 where he mentions their steadiness under fire and devotion to duty.

The workers of the Egyptian Camel Transport Corps were recruited from extremely poor villages in Upper Egypt. At the beginning of the war, volunteers for the Egyptian Camel Transport Corps, who came from extremely poor villages in Upper Egypt, like those working in the Egyptian Labour Corps, received a daily incentive of 7 piastres (equivalent to one shilling and sixpence), in addition to their rations. However, later, it became necessary to use the British military authority that had already been imposed over all Egyptian civil and military officials. The Mudir (district governor), deputy governor, or Omdah (village headman), who were the local authorities in Egyptian towns and villages, would organize press gangs to forcibly recruit workers in return for financial payments, while providing the necessary local armed guards to force the workers to continue working. Members of the Egyptian Camel Transport Corps were 'sealed' by a seal attached to their wrists for periods that appear to have started as quite short term but became quite extended as the importance of their service was recognised.

== Work ==
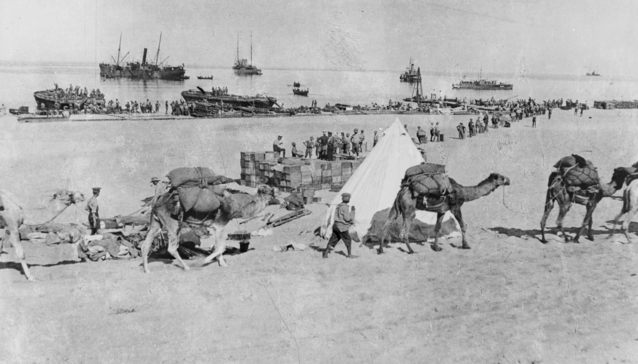
Stores being unloaded and carried to a dump being constructed behind the tent at El Arish. A caravan of loaded camels is in the foreground

The members of the Egyptian Camel Transport Corps transported supplies to the fighting troops, from one end of the Sinai and Palestine Campaign to the other; from the desert of the Egyptian Sinai Peninsula to the northern Levant (now Syria). They saw service transporting supplies of all kinds across the flooded plain north of Gaza and Beersheba, up into the rocky inhospitable Judean Hills towards Jerusalem in late 1917, down the precipitous tracks to Jericho in the Jordan Valley, up into the even less hospitable hills of Moab towards Es Salt and Amman and also followed on the great victorious advance northwards in 1918, carrying ammunition, water and all types of stores for the men and horses of the fighting units at the front, and carried the wounded back.

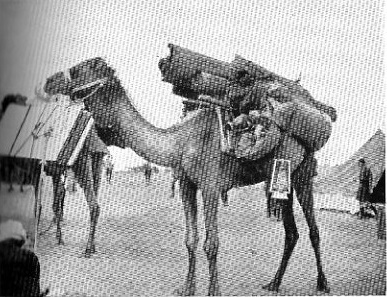
Brigade Headquarters Office Ready for the Road

Training of the camel corps had less to do with the Egyptian camel drivers who were often familiar with camel care and control, being mainly concerned with the problems the Australian and British officers and NCOs, who had transferred from the Army Service Corps and other AIF units, had in dealing with the animals. During this time, one or more of these men were regularly sent to hospitals with camel bites. Of the Australians, 49 were eventually commissioned and six became company commanders, so the Anzac and Imperial/Australian Mounted Divisions had a strong national component in their supporting camel transport.

In 1917 the Camel Transport Corps consisted of 35,000 camels, organized in 2,000 strong camel companies. They worked as Corps level transport, or in convoys, transporting supplies and stores from railhead to corps and divisions and to brigades, regiments and battalions suffering 9 per cent casualties during that year.

From December, 1915, to demobilization in 1918, some 72,500 camels were employed and 170,000 Egyptian drivers passed through the Corps. Of these 222 were killed in action and 1,458 were wounded while 4,010 died of disease, 78 went missing and 66 were taken prisoner.

== Scope of Operations ==
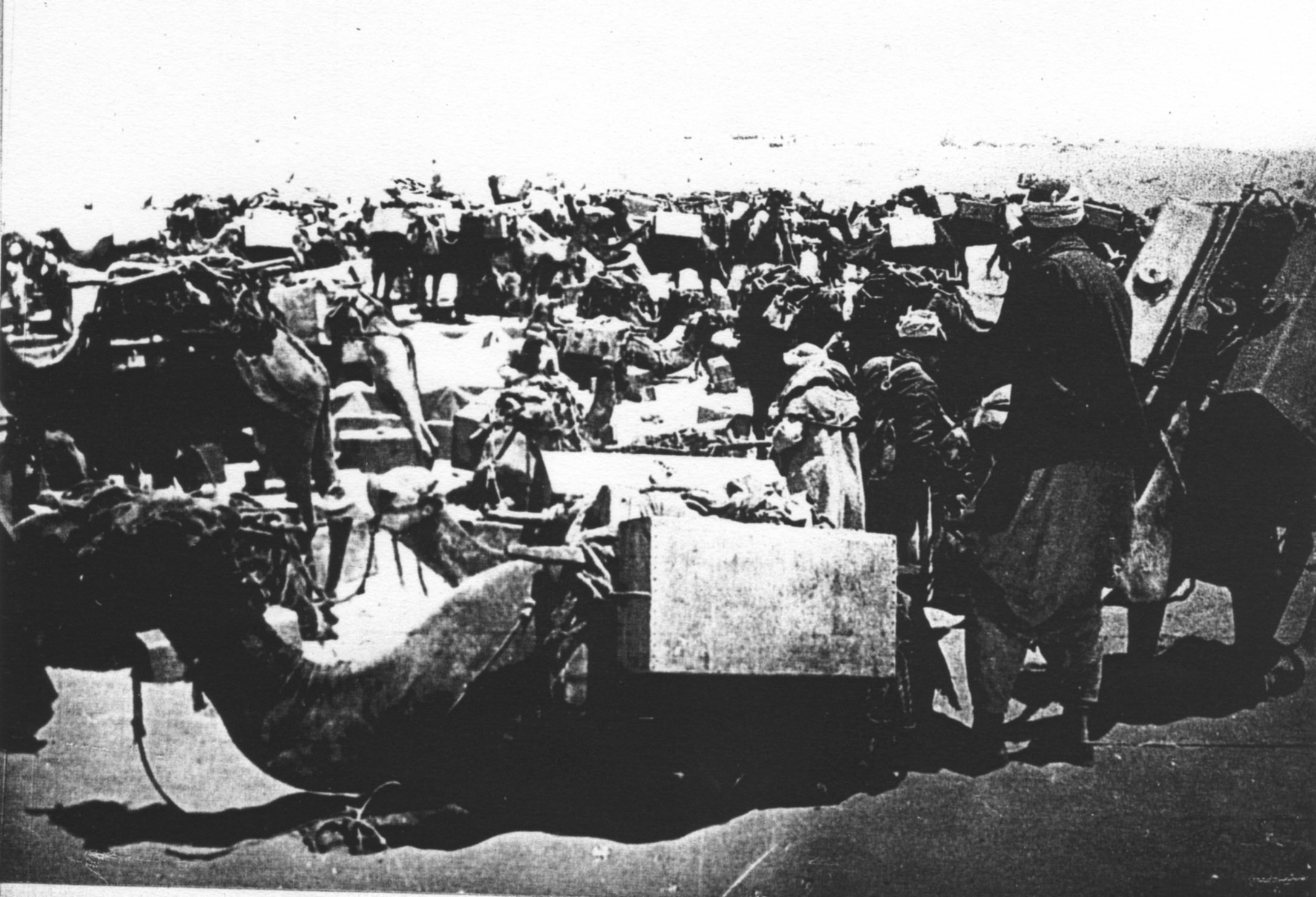
Egyptian Camel Transport Corps camels loaded with two 12 gallon tanks called fantasses

During the Sinai Campaign, camels were used to carry the ambulance equipment of surgical instruments, splints, drugs, dressings, food, and tents, often marching independently of the rest of the ambulance; but despite their slow rate of marching, were rarely late arriving. Mobile columns attached to each light horse regiment, were established in June 1916 and attached to the ambulance section of these columns were 19 camels and drivers allocated for transporting water and equipment and an additional 44 camels and drivers.

Camels take long slow strides with an irregular swaying movement (they can't be hurried) and led by a driver travelled at an average speed of 2.5 miles per hour (4 km/h), fully loaded with two casualties or two fantasses containing 10 to 15 imperial gallons (50 to 70 L) of water. They may have to travel as far as 25 miles (40 km) accompanied by flies and camel smells and grunts.

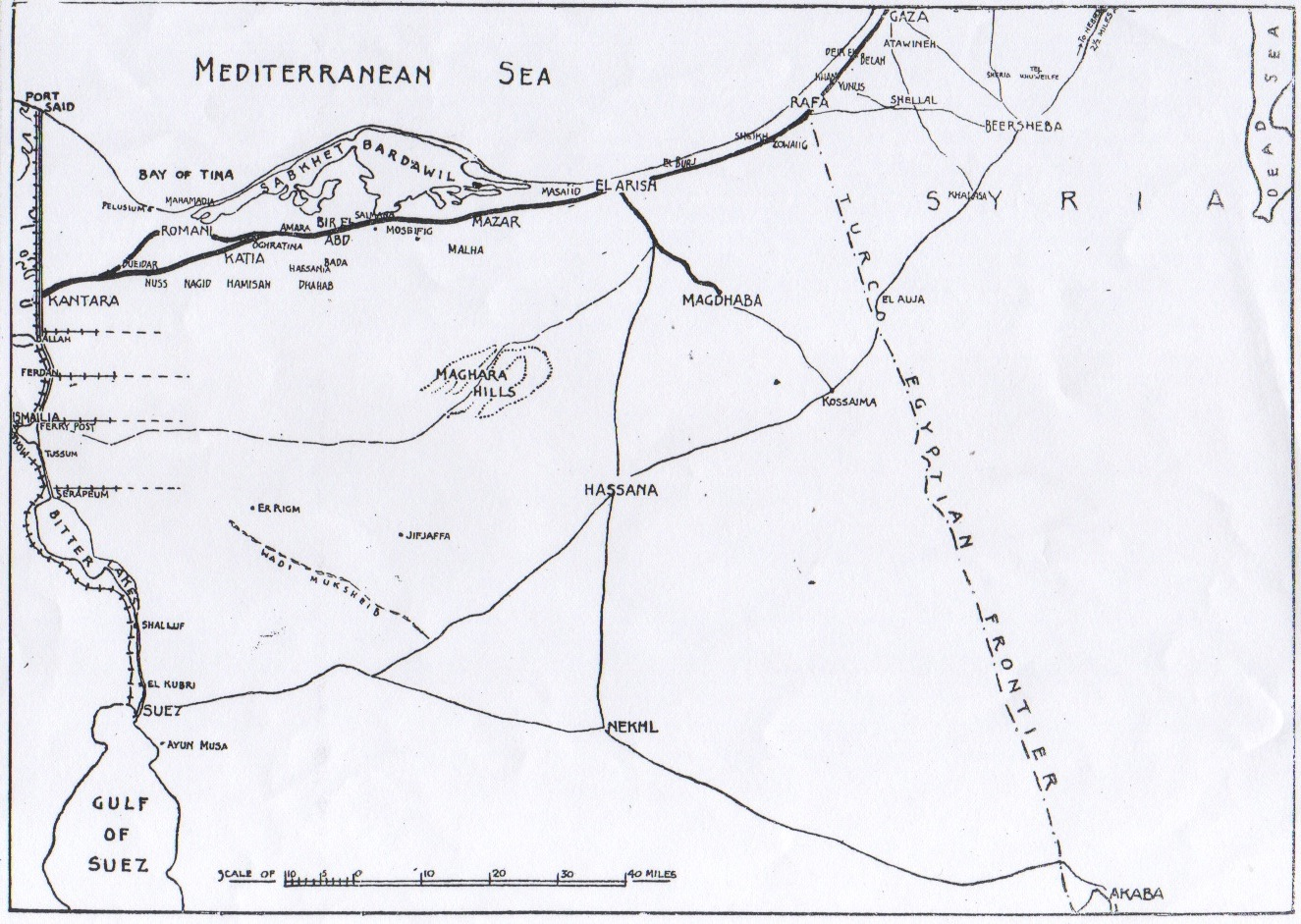
Sinai Peninsula

=== Patrols ===
As all wheeled vehicles had been left at Kantara, nothing but sections of Camel Transport Corps accompanied all the patrols across Sinai as on Monday 29 May 1916, when a patrol by the New Zealand Mounted Rifle Brigade was accompanied by 850 camels carrying water, food and ammunition when they rode out from Etmaler.

The drivers and camels of the Egyptian Camel Transport Corps were also called on in the Sinai to transport aeroplanes. General Harry Chauvel describes how this was done:

"We also rescued an aeroplane which had come down in the desert. That is the third we have helped in during the last few days. They have to take them to pieces and pack the bits on camels. The camel that gets the engine does not appreciate it! When they come down in the desert they sometimes have to walk as much as thirty miles back to our lines."

=== Battle of Romani ===
On 21 July, the Egyptian Camel Transport Corps marched out for Romani with 2000 camels, 20 riding dromedaries, 12,000 natives, O.C., Adjutant, 5 Sectional OCs including McPherson, a number of NCOs and the usual attendant details – saddlers, ambulance, vets, batmen, orderlies etc. Ordered to march in mid summer during the middle of the day the sand burnt and cracked the camel drivers' feet. Half didn't have a water bottle and they fainted with thirst, heat and weariness, falling out or plodding on blindly.

About 10,000 Egyptian Camel Transport Corps camels concentrated at Romani as well as innumerable troops prior to the attack. Until more camel transport was accumulated at Romani and Pelusium for the distribution of supplies and drinking water from railhead, the firepower of the main defences could only be increased by moving up the machine gun companies of 53 and 54 Divisions.

On the first day of battle, 4 August 1916 McPherson and his section of Egyptian Camel Transport Corps was attempting to deliver water to the Worcester Regiment of 5th Mounted Division, when they came under fire:

"on reaching the exposed summit we were greeted with a few shells; one 'coalbox' falling between our lines getting a camel and slightly hurting its rider. There was a bit of stampede ... I pointed out [to the Egyptian camel drivers] that I should be obliged to use my revolver on the first who deserted or disobeyed and that the rest [of his subordinates] would use their rifles if necessary. They swore that they would stick with me and obey, whatever happened, and I may as well say at once that they behaved splendidly through stirring and sometimes trying times. The way to Hod Nagur Ali where the Worcesters were supposed to be, lay over many similar ridges, but a higher ridge to the North ... were such that no camels would be put at them under normal circumstances, but luckily I had trained my animals to beeline marching, and circumstances were anything but normal, and it was really wonderful how they took the slopes. ... [On finding the Worcesters] it was sad to see how the men drunk with blood and mad with thirst wasted the precious stuff in their eagerness to drink, and their officers seemed powerless to keep discipline at this stage.

McPherson and his section of Egyptian Camel Transport Corps was also involved the next day, in the pursuit on 5 August. At 10 am his 200 camels moved out from Pelusium Station, this time to supply water to the 127th Brigade, composed of the Manchester regiments in the 42nd Division. However, before they arrived a tragedy was unfolding; McPherson

"mounted many ... jaded infantrymen, and some of the natives on our already burdened and tired camels, but many of these riders had to give place to poor chaps in extremis. These lay about the battlefield, many in the attitudes of death, but for the most part unwounded and simply dying of thirst and fatigue in the burning sand under a fiery sun. Many were tied apathetic and helpless on the camels."

Private Robert Bethel, also involved with transporting water and provisions to the fighting men, was serving in the Army Service Corps in support of the 42nd Division's 125th Brigade. He describes his involvement on 5 August 1916:

"then at 4.30 in the afternoon our Camel caravan moved off, & it was a huge affair, hundreds of camels loaded with stores and fantasses of water, & pack mules loaded with ammunition... I had been instructed to stay with 125 H.Q. but to report to my officer in the morning. I was unable to find him so of course I went with the rest, thinking that I would see something exciting, never dreaming of the horrors to go through. I marched with the rest & all went well while the morning was cool, but as soon as the sun got up, & beat down on us it was awful, & still we marched on mile after mile. Each man had only a water bottle full & about 9.30 or ten am a lot of them had drunk it all, then the trouble began. As we marched men were dropping down right & left, absolutely exhausted, & as we passed, bringing up the rear, they would keep asking for water; the poor devils looking pitiful, lying there unable to walk & not a drop of water to wet their lips, there was no R.A.M.C. to follow & pick up the bad cases or give them a drink ... At last we halted about 11.30 & our party filled our bottles, and as we were doing so stragglers were coming & asking, nay almost crying for water, but the officer in charge couldn’t give them any, & told them to find their own unit & draw water from them, but the men were lost, didn’t know where their battalions were & were hardly strong enough to pull one leg after the other, so they stood watching the water being issued, & looking half mad, seeing the water trickling into the bottles & being unable to have a drink. It was awful. The native camel-drivers were in a similar position, they had no water, and no food & were continually asking for it. Then I had a long drink & it was delicious. I could have gone on drinking for ever."

On 6 August, the eve of the Greater Bairam (celebrating the end of the Islamic year) the Egyptian Camel Transport Corps at Romani was ordered to move out at dawn to toil eastward. In the morning 150 men (most of whom were past the end of their contracts and entitled to be discharged) refused orders to fill their water bottles, draw their extra rations and saddle up. One man was hit about the head with the butt of a pistol and the dissenters were separated into small groups. They were divided up amongst three brigades of artillery, two field companies of engineers, the Glasgow Yeomanry, a Mobile Veterinary Section, a Machine Gun and Wire Line section; all units of the 52nd (Lowland) Infantry Division.

=== Advance to Bir el Abd ===
Ordered to follow the troops attempting to cut off the enemy retreat, McPherson describes the problems which developed among his section of the Egyptian Camel Transport Corps when the terms of employment were changed and resulting unrest was dealt with.

"My two hundred natives were nearly all past the end of their contracts and entitled to discharge, and they believed that they had been brought back from Nighiliat [Negiliat] for that purpose and for payment. It would have been hard enough to have been kept at Romani during the feast, even had they been allowed light duty and permitted to feast and keep up their traditional ceremonies, but to have to march out at dawn eastward to toil and perhaps death was more than their patient hearts could bear.

Trouble began in some companies under orders overnight, but my men took the order in silence, and I hoped a little coaxing and pressure in the morning and the lure of extra rations and new water bottles would be sufficient with them as they were a good lot and very much attached to me. However, I was awakened before five by angry mutterings outside my tent and when I went out I found about 150 fanatics surrounding it. I ordered them to fill their water bottles, draw their extra rations and saddle up, but their head man explained that whatever happened they would drawn neither water nor rations nor load up nor march out on their feast day and they demanded their pay and discharge.

I parleyed and ordered without effect for a bit and noticed that they were concealing weapons. Suddenly a great handsome black devil about 6ft 4ins high ... came threateningly forward and I covered him with my revolver: to my disgust I found it was choked with sand and would not revolve, so I whacked him twice over the head with the butt end. ... Then I invited any other 'gentlemen' who did not want to march out to come forward, but they all assured me they only wanted to fill their bottles and to work. I don't think there would have been any further trouble, but my NCO came on the scene and several bodies of British troops, and the two hundred natives were divided up amongst three Brigades (seven Batteries) of Artillery, two Field Companies of Engineers, the Glasgow Yeomanry, a Mobile Veterinary Section, a Machine Gun and a Wire Line Section, these being the units of the 1/52nd Division to which I was attached."

=== Bir el Abd ===
Bostock with the 3rd Light Horse Brigade Scouts near Bir el Abd, guided in the Egyptian Camel Transport Corps:

"On August 9th I was again scouting. I then went to meet a camel convoy and acted as their escort to guide them to our position. ... We had no water or rations for two days and I was terribly thirsty."

McPherson describes Bir el Abd:

"The place must have seen bloody fighting, and a succession of occupation, for English, Turkish and German accoutrements and bloodstained tunics were mixed up everywhere. Soon after emerging we came across a number of dead camels and some human remains. The saddles were of the, to me, well known CTC type. Shells of all types, including the mighty missiles fired by our monitors, were lying about, and thousands of shrapnel bullets on the sand."

=== Bir el Maghara Raid October 1916 ===
Sections of the Camel Transport Corps took part in operations to Bir el Maghara in the interior of the Sinai Peninsula. The Column formed of 800 Australian Light Horse, 400 City of London Yeomanry, 600 Mounted Camelry and 4,500 Transport Camels, also 200 Camels for Army Medical Corps work moved out from Bayoud on 13 October 1916.

=== El Arish ===
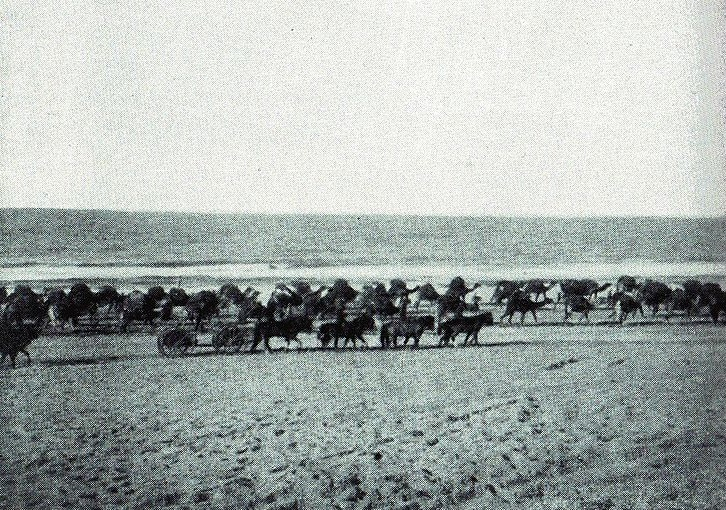
Transport on the beach at El Arish

The provision of water for the attacking force was the most difficult, but most vital element in the preparation for the attack on El Arish as from Mazar to El Arish there was no water and the Turkish defences at El Arish covered all the water in that area. So operations had to wait until the middle of December when the pipe–line had advanced sufficiently for water to be stored at Maadan (kilo. 128) and for the concentration of camels and drivers of the Egyptian Camel Transport Corps, large enough to carry the water forward in support the attack force. Preparations were not complete until 20 December, but in the meantime the enemy had abandoned the town.

== Other campaigns ==
The CTC also participated in the First Transjordan attack on Amman (1918). Supplies of rations and forage were carried by the Egyptian Camel Transport Corps during the advance and retirement of Shea's, augmenting supplies carried by the troops and sent up to the troops fighting at Amman in March 1918 with the help of some pack-horses.

By 1 May 1918 during the Second Transjordan attack on Shunet Nimrin and Es Salt Allenby wrote to the British War Office regarding difficulties he was having in recruitment for the Egyptian Camel Transport Corps. "I have sent to you, today, an official letter – on the subject of enlistments for the Camel Transport Corps. We can't get the men, and we can't do without them; and I am advised that the only way to get them is compulsion – on the lines of the Corvée – but paid, of course, at the present rate of wages. As you know, I am opposed to compulsion; but we seem to be between the Devil and the Deep Sea, and I don’t know how to avoid it."
