= List of Australian corps in World War I =

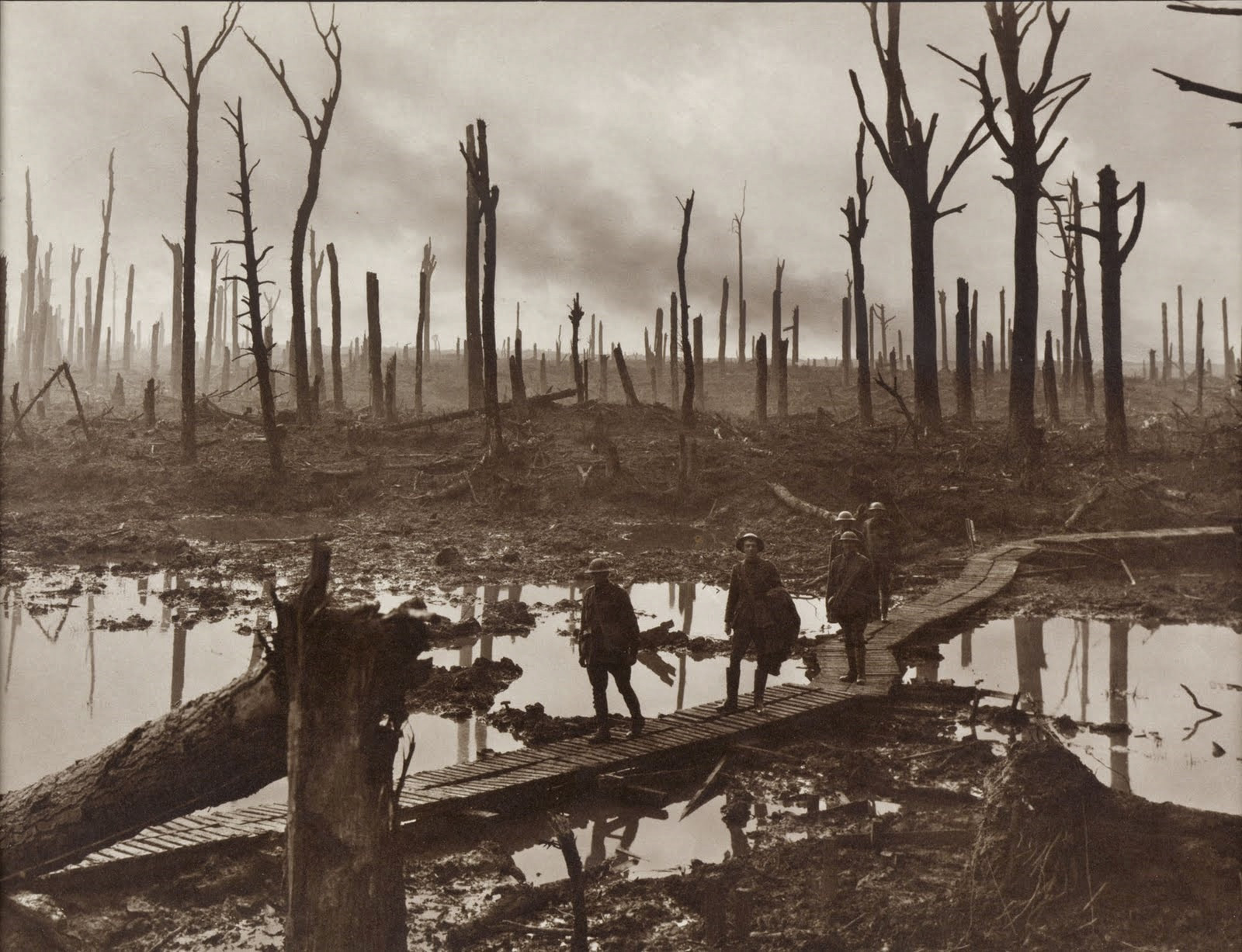
Gunners from the Australian 4th Division during Third Battle of Ypres October 1917

The term "corps" can refer to a large-scale military formation consisting of two or more divisions, or a branch of service. During World War I there were five corps-level military formations raised as part of the Australian Army. Primarily infantry or mounted formations, the majority of these included British, New Zealand and Indian elements as well as Australian forces and were commanded by both British and Australian officers at various times throughout their existence. These formations served at Gallipoli, in Egypt, in the Sinai and Palestine campaign and on the Western Front. Not all of the corps existed at the same time, and several were disbanded over the course of the war, or reorganised to form others.

In addition, there were several military branches in the Army during this time that also bore the title of "corps", such as the Australian Flying Corps, the Australian Cycling Corps, the Australian Mining Corps, the Australian Camel Corps, and the Australian Machine Gun Corps.

== Military formations ==
| Designation | Date raised | Date disbanded | Campaigns | Notes |
|---|---|---|---|---|
| Australian and New Zealand Army Corps | 1915 | 1916 | Gallipoli | |
| I Anzac Corps | 1916 | 1917 | Western Front | |
| II Anzac Corps | 1916 | 1917 | Western Front | |
| Australian Corps | 1917 | 1919 | Western Front | |
| Desert Mounted Corps | 1917 | 1919 | Sinai and Palestine | |

== See also ==
- Military history of Australia during World War I
