= List of Welsh Victoria Cross recipients of World War I =

The following people are Welsh recipients of the Victoria Cross during World War I, with a default sort by surname.

Name	Year	Conflict	Place	Country
Frederick Barter	1915	World War I	Festubert	France
Robert James Bye	1917	World War I	Yser Canal	Belgium
James Llewellyn Davies	1917	World War I	Polygon Wood	Belgium
Lewis Pugh Evans	1917	World War I	Zonnebeke	Belgium
John Fox-Russell	1917	World War I	Tel-el-Khuweilfeh	Palestine
William Charles Fuller	1914	World War I	Chivy-sur-Aisne	France
Hubert William Lewis	1916	World War I	Macukovo	Greece
Ivor Rees	1917	World War I	Pilkem	Belgium
Lionel Wilmot Brabazon Rees	1916	World War I	Double Crassieurs	France
Richard William Leslie Wain	1917	World War I	Cambrai/Marcoing	France
William Herbert Waring	1918	World War I	Ronssoy	France
Henry Weale	1918	World War I	Bazentin-le-Grand	France
John (Jack) Henry Williams	1918	World War I	Villers Outreaux	France
William Williams	1917	World War I	Atlantic	France
