= Labour corps =

Organisation providing military labour

Labour corps, alternatively spelt labor corps in American English, usually refers to an organisation that provides labour for military-related purposes. It may be a civilian auxiliary or an internal branch (i.e. an administrative corps or mustering) of a particular military service.

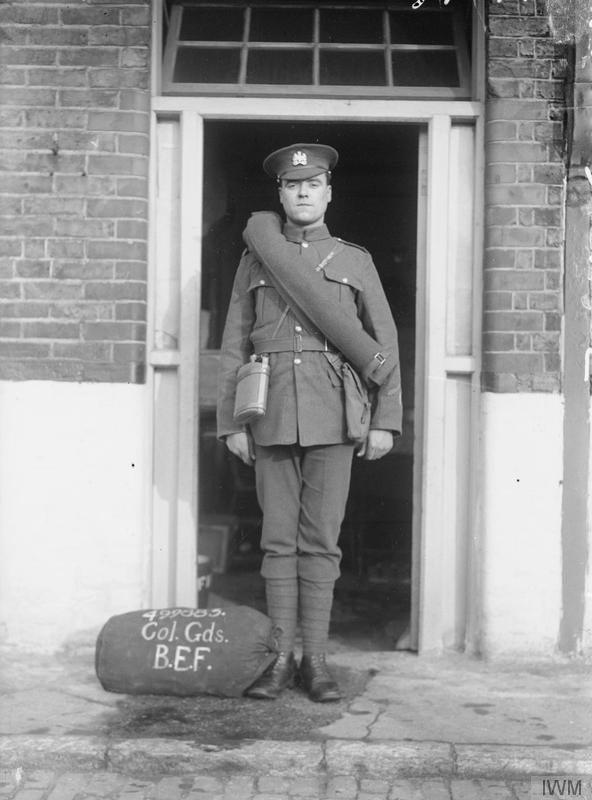
A private of the Reserve Employment Company (British Army Labour Corps) in marching order during the First World War

Members of labour corps often perform unskilled manual labour in fields such as construction, military engineering, or logistics (especially transport).

== See also ==
- Labour corps (disambiguation) — Examples of labour corps throughout history.
