= List of British corps in World War II =

During the Second World War, the British Army created several field corps; these were formations that controlled multiple divisions in addition to artillery, engineers, and logistical units that would be used to support the divisions as needed. A corps itself was generally under the control of a higher formation such as a field army, an army group or a command. During the war, the British military contained 16 field corps and three that were intended to control anti-aircraft units. The latter were not comparable in role to field corps that were intended to control divisions in combat; anti-aircraft units were assigned to control anti-aircraft formations within a designated area, which could cover hundreds or thousands of square miles. Through deception efforts, a further 11 corps existed within the British military structure. Twenty-seven real or fictitious corps were active during the war, although they did not all exist at the same time and there was overlap between notional and real corps. (Note: See below list for complete breakdown. In addition to the corps formed by the British Army, the British Indian Army contained or formed the Burma or Burcorps, III, XV, XXI, XXXIII and XXXIV Corps.)

In 1939, at the start of the war, the British Army had only one field corps (I Corps); this was quickly followed by two more to help control infantry divisions that were assigned to the British Expeditionary Force (BEF). Within the UK, a further six corps were formed in 1940, and two more were formed in the following years, the last being the I Airborne Corps in December 1943. XIII Corps was formed in 1941, and was the first British corps to be formed outside the UK. (Note: See below list for complete breakdown, including dates.) Within the British military, corps were commanded by lieutenant-generals.

The size and composition of a corps could vary depending on the mission assigned to it, as well as the tactical and strategic situation. The Western Desert Force, which was formed by re-designating a divisional headquarters, grew to a force of 36,000 men spread over one infantry and one armoured division as well as smaller units. At the start of Operation Epsom, in Normandy in June 1944, VIII Corps was 57,000 men strong; it controlled logistical, administrative, engineer, and artillery assets, two infantry divisions, one armoured division, one armoured brigade, and one tank brigade. During the operation, its strength was increased to 65,000 men. (Note: See List of British mobile brigades during the Second World War for the difference between armoured and tank brigades.) The next major operation in which the corps was involved, Operation Goodwood in Normandy in July 1944, saw a completely different order of battle. It consisted of three armoured divisions, in addition to logistical, administrative, engineer, and artillery forces, with a combined strength of 62,000 men. British army corps did not only just control British forces. On the eve of the Second Battle of El Alamein, the Eighth Army contained three corps and was a multi-national force. XIII Corps contained British and French formations, X Corps contained only British troops, while XXX Corps consisted of Australian, British, Indian, New Zealand, and South African divisions.

Unlike the other corps, the three anti-aircraft corps were static formations that administered the aerial defence of the UK. Each covered a different section of the UK and contained a different number of anti-aircraft divisions; five for I Anti-Aircraft Corps that covered the southern UK, four for II Anti-Aircraft Corps assigned to defend the Midlands, and three for III Anti-Aircraft Corps that administered those in the north. As the war progressed, more resources were allocated to I Anti-Aircraft Corps as it defended vital regions of the country that were vulnerable to Luftwaffe attacks. In October 1942, all three corps were disbanded as part of a reorganization of the UK's aerial defences. The corps and divisions were replaced with seven groups that were intended to ease the command and control of the anti-aircraft formations, save manpower, balance out responsibility, and make the formations more flexible.

== Corps ==
Corps
Formation name	Created	Ceased to exist	Insignia	Locations served	Notable campaigns	Notes	Ref
I Corps	1902	Jul 1945	A white spearhead pointing up, on a scarlet diamond.	UK, France, Belgium, Netherlands, Germany	Battle of France, Normandy campaign, Allied advance from Paris to the Rhine, Western Allied invasion of Germany	The only permanent corps of the British Army in 1939, when the Second World War broke out, to which its spearhead insignia alluded. I Corps remained active throughout the war, served with the BEF, the Second Army, and First Canadian Army. It was in Germany at the close of the war. By mid-July 1945, with the war in Europe over, I Corps was converted into the First Corps District of the British military government in Germany, and then administered Rhine Province and Westphalia.	
I Airborne Corps	Dec 1943	Oct 1945	Light blue Pegasus and rider on purple background	UK, Netherlands, Germany, British India	Operation Market Garden	The corps was formed on 9 December 1943, officially as Headquarters, Airborne Troops (21st Army Group). It initially commanded all British airborne until those needed for Operation Overlord were reassigned to other formations. The corps first combat operation was Operation Market Garden, in which it led the 1st Airborne Division into action. In June 1945, after the end of fighting in Europe, the corps was transferred to British India, where It was intended to oversee attacks on Singapore and Thailand. However, no operations took place as the Pacific War ended soon after the redeployment. The corps was disbanded on 23 October 1945.	
I Anti-Aircraft Corps	Jun 1938	Oct 1942	A German eagle in red, pieced by a red arrow, on a blue background.	UK	Battle of Britain, The Blitz, Baedeker Blitz	The corps initially controlled anti-aircraft defences for London and the Home Counties. After the outbreak of the war, it was expanded to control all formations covering southern England and Wales, which corresponded with No. 10 and No. 11 Group RAF. It was the largest of the three anti-aircraft corps that were formed. It was disbanded when the anti-aircraft defences were reorganised. The insignia depicted the shooting of a German eagle.	
II Corps	Sep 1939	Mar 1944	A red fish on alternating blue and white wavy horizontal stripes, within a red border.	UK, France, Belgium (1939), Belgium (notionally, 1944–1945)	Battle of France	Served with the BEF during the Battle of France and was evacuated back to the UK, where it remained on home defence duties. The corps was briefly disbanded in 1943 but then reformed and existed until early 1944, when it was again disbanded. Thereafter, it was used for deception purposes, and played a role in Operation Fortitude and additional efforts until it was notionally disbanded in December 1944. The Imperial War Museum stated the original insignia was blue-and-white wavy lines. A fish was added later to suggest it was jumping over a brook—a pun on the name of the corps' first commander Alan Brooke.	(Note: II Corps was initially disbanded in April 1943. Colin Mackie, a school teacher who has been awarded for his efforts towards maintaining the public history and heritage, wrote that in May 1943, II Corps was reformed when XI Corps was renamed. H. F. Joslen, who compiled the official British order of battle for the war, wrote the 54th (East Anglian) and the 61st Infantry Divisions transferred from XI Corps to II Corps District on 15 May 1943.)
II Anti-Aircraft Corps	Apr 1939	Oct 1942	An upraised mailed army clutching a dagger, all in pale blue, on a red background.	UK	Battle of Britain, The Blitz, Baedeker Blitz	The corps controlled anti-aircraft defences for the Midlands and parts of northern England, corresponding with No. 9 and No. 12 Group RAF. The corps was disbanded when the anti-aircraft defences were reorganised.	
III Corps	Oct 1939	End of the war	A five-lobed green leaf on a white rectangle	UK, France, Belgium, Egypt, Syria, Italy, Greece	Battle of France, Greek Civil War	Fought in France and Belgium with the BEF, and was evacuated back to the UK where it remained on home defence duties until disbanded in 1943. It was then revived as a deception formation for Operation Cascade and was notionally transported to Iran. The corps was then actually reformed in the Middle East, subsequently moved to Italy, and was then dispatched to reoccupy Greece following a German withdrawal. The corps remained in Greece until the end of the war, when it was converted into HQ Land Forces Greece.	
III Anti-Aircraft Corps	Apr 1939	Oct 1942	Alternating red and white vertical stripes. The white stripe contains three red crescents, horns facing right.	UK	Battle of Britain, The Blitz, Baedeker Blitz	The corps controlled anti-aircraft defences for Scotland, Northern Ireland, and northern England that were not covered by II Anti-Aircraft Corps. These areas corresponding with No. 13 and No. 14 Group RAF. The corps was disbanded when the anti-aircraft defences were reorganised.	
IV Corps	Feb 1940	End of the war	A black elephant on a red background	UK, Norway, British India, Burma	Norwegian campaign, Burma campaign	Claude Auchinleck was tasked with forming IV Corps to move to France to reinforce the BEF. He chose an insignia based on the cap badge of his regiment, the 1st Punjab Regiment. In April 1940, the corps was used to temporarily form HQ Northern Norway Land Forces. It returned to the UK and undertook home defence duties until it was dispatched to British India in 1942. It subsequently fought in Burma under the Fourteenth Army and ended the war in Burma under the Twelfth Army.	
V Corps	Jun 1940	End of the War	A white Viking ship on a black background. The sail includes black stripes and a red cross.	UK, Algeria, Tunisia, Italy	Tunisian campaign, Italian campaign	A second corps Claude Auchinleck was tasked with forming, V Corps used men from IV Corps who had been dispatched to Norway. The insignia, a Viking ship, commemorated this connection; its choice of colour echoed that of the First-World-War-era V Corps. The Corps undertook home defence in the UK, then joined the First Army and was dispatched to fight in North Africa. V Corps later fought as part of the Eighth Army in Sicily and Italy, where it ended the war.	
VI Corps	Jun 1940	Jul 1940	N/A	UK	N/A	In mid-June 1940, VI Corps was formed in Lisburn, Northern Ireland, to command all troops located there. On 12 July 1940, it became British Troops in Ireland, which was later renamed British Troops in Northern Ireland.	
VII Corps	Jul 1940	Dec 1940	A scarlet horizontal diamond	UK (actual and notional)	N/A	Formed on 7 July and composed of British and Canadian forces under the command of Canadian officer Andrew McNaughton. On 25 December 1940, VII Corps was redesignated as the Canadian Corps. The corps was revived as part of the deception effort Operation Fortitude in April 1944; it was provided with an insignia of a scallop shell on a blue background. German intelligence were fed information to state the corps was drained of manpower to replace casualties suffered by the 21st Army Group in Belgium, and it was notionally disbanded in January 1945.	
VIII Corps	Jul 1940	Jul 1945	A charging knight, facing right, in white on a red rectangle.	UK, France, Belgium, Netherlands, Germany	Normandy campaign, Allied advance from Paris to the Rhine, Western Allied invasion of Germany	Served on home defence duties until 1944, when it formed part of the 21st Army Group and took part in the liberation of German-occupied Western Europe. By the end of the war in Europe, the corps was in Germany and by mid-July 1945 was converted into an administrative district of the British military government in Germany based at Pion. The second version of the corp's insignia, which was displayed during the fighting in Europe, is depicted.	
IX Corps	Jun 1941	May 1943	a black cat on an orange background	UK, Algeria, Tunisia	Tunisian campaign	The insignia represented a "kilkenny cat", which was chosen as Kilkenny, Ireland, was the hometown of the corp's first commanding officer Ridley Pakenham-Walsh. IX Corps undertook home defence duties until 1942, when it was deployed to North Africa. At that point, the insignia was changed to a yellow trumpet on a red background. The corps was disbanded at the end of the fighting in North Africa.	
X Corps	Jun 1940	Jul 1945	A white rectangle and a white circle, both on a green background with a domed top.	UK, Egypt, Italian-Libya, Tunisia, Italy, Greece	North African campaign, Italian campaign, Greek Civil War	Formed for home defence duties, it was transferred to Egypt in August 1942 and fought across North Africa. It then served in Italy and Greece. In May 1945, the corps was placed in reserve and was scheduled to be transferred to Asia. By July, it was still in the Mediterranean theatre when it was disbanded. According to the Imperial War Museum, the insignia can be read as "10" with the symbols rotated 90 degrees. The museum also noted varying designs and coloured insignia existed at the same time.	
XI Corps	Jun 1940	May 1943	A black-and-white chequered tower on a black diamond background.	UK	N/A	Formed for home defence duties. The insignia depicted a fortified tower, which represented the large number of defensive strong points the corps helped construct.	
XII Corps	Jun 1940	Jun 1945	Three trees on a white oval background	UK, France, Belgium, Netherlands, Germany	Normandy campaign, Allied advance from Paris to the Rhine, Western Allied invasion of Germany	Per the Imperial War Museum, the insignia represented an oak, ash, and thorn tree of Puck of Pook's Hill. This design linked the corps' first commander Andrew Thorne with the area of Sussex where the corps was formed. It was initially raised for home defence duties and was later assigned to the 21st Army Group. From 1944, it fought in northwest Europe and ended the war in Hamburg, Germany. It was not selected to be part of the occupational forces and was stood down following the end of fighting in Europe.	
XIII Corps	Jan 1941	1946	A leaping gazelle in red, on a white circle. The white circle is on a red diamond background.	Egypt, Italian-Libya, Tunisia, Italy, Austria	Western Desert campaign, Tunisian campaign, Italian campaign	Created by the re-designation of the Western Desert Force. After Operation Compass ended in early 1941, XIII Corps was stood down following a re-organisation of the British command structure within Egypt and the captured Italian-Libyan province of Cyrenaica. It was reformed in October 1941 and fought across North Africa and then in Italy. XIII Corps was based in Austria and northwest Italy when the war ended. In 1946, the corps was converted into HQ British Element Trieste Force (BETFOR), which retained the corps' insignia and was based in Trieste. The insignia represented a gazelle from the Western Desert, where the corps was formed.	
XIV Corps	Dec 1943	End of the war	A black wolf head on a white field	Algeria, Tunisia, Italy (notionally)	N/A	Notional corps formed for deception purposes around the Mediterranean theatre.	
XVI Corps	Nov 1943	Unknown	Phoenix bearing a torch, emerging from red flames on a white field	Egypt (notionally)	N/A	Notional corps formed to threaten an invasion of German-occupied Greek territories.	
XVII Corps	Nov 1944	Nov 1944	N/A	UK (notionally)	N/A	Notional corps formed to threaten an invasion of German-occupied Greek territories.	
XVIII Corps	Jun 1941	Jun 1941	Unknown	Cyprus (notionally)	N/A	Notional corps formed to deceive the Axis about the strength of British forces based in Cyprus. Redesignated as XXV Corps, another notional formation with the same role.	
XIX Airborne Corps	Oct 1944	Dec 1944	Light blue Pegasus and rider on purple background	UK (notionally)	N/A	Notional corps formed to inflate the size of the First Allied Airborne Army. The corps was notionally disbanded in December 1944 after German intelligence had been informed it was merely an administrative formation.	
XXI Corps	1943	1943	N/A	UK (notionally)	N/A	Notional corps formed as part of the deception effort Operation Tindall.	
XXV Corps	Jun 1941	Unknown	A red lion passant gardant on a yellow field	Cyprus (notionally)	N/A	Notional corps formed to deceive the Axis about the strength of British forces based in Cyprus.	
XXVI Airborne Corps	Nov 1944	End of the war	A depiction of the god Mercury	British India (notionally)	N/A	Notional corps formed to deceive Japan about the strength of British forces based in region and to project a threat towards Thailand.	
XXX Corps	Oct 1941	Jul 1945		Egypt, Italian-Libya, Tunisia, UK, France, Belgium, Netherlands, Germany	Western Desert campaign, Tunisian campaign, Normandy campaign, Allied advance from Paris to the Rhine, Western Allied invasion of Germany	Started to form in early October 1941 in Egypt, XXX Corps was initially known as the Armoured Corps and became active on 21 October. The corps fought across North Africa and was transferred to the UK in early 1944. From June 1944, it fought in northwest Europe and was located within Germany when the war in Europe ended. By July 1945, it had been transformed into an administrative district of the British military government in Germany covering the Hanover region, and was headquartered at Nienburg.	
Western Desert Force	Jun 1940	Oct 1941	N/A	Egypt, Italian-Libya	Western Desert campaign	Formed on 17 June 1940, when the headquarters of the 6th Infantry Division was redesignated and assigned to control all British forces in Egypt. In January 1941, it was redesignated as XIII Corps. In March 1941, following a strategic reversal in Italian Libya, a new Western Desert Force was formed. It led British forces during operations Brevity and Battleaxe. In October 1941, Western Defence Force again became XIII Corps.	
