= List of British armies in the First World War =

This page is a list of British army-level formations existing during the First World War.

== Expeditionary Forces ==
- British Expeditionary Force (BEF)
  - First Army
  - Second Army
  - Third Army
  - Fourth Army
  - Fifth Army (originally the Reserve Army)
- Mediterranean Expeditionary Force (MEF)
  - Dardanelles Army
  - Egyptian Expeditionary Force (EEF)
  - British Salonika Army (BSF)
- Mesopotamian Expeditionary Force
- British Expeditionary Force in Italy

== Home Forces ==
- Central Force
  - First Army
  - Second Army
  - Third Army
- Northern Army
- Southern Army
