= Egyptian Labour Corps =

- Uniform blouse from the collection of the National Army Museum
- Active: 1914–1918
- Country: Sultanate of Egypt
- Allegiance: British Empire
- Branch: Army
- Type: Labour
- Role: Combat service support
- Size: Half a million labourers between 1914 and 1918
- Nickname: ELC

The Egyptian Labour Corps (Arabic: فيلق العمل المصري, romanized: faylaq al-ʿamal al-Maṣriyy; also known as the ELC or Labour Corps) was a group of Egyptian labourers who worked for the British Army in Egypt during the First World War. Around half a million men were recruited into the corps between 1914 and 1918. It was formed from Egyptian fellahin from Upper Egypt. The duties of the labourers in the corps focused on hard labor and logistical work to support the British forces during the war.

Members of the Egyptian Labour Corps performing Tahtib, a traditional stick-fighting art from Upper Egypt

== Historical context ==
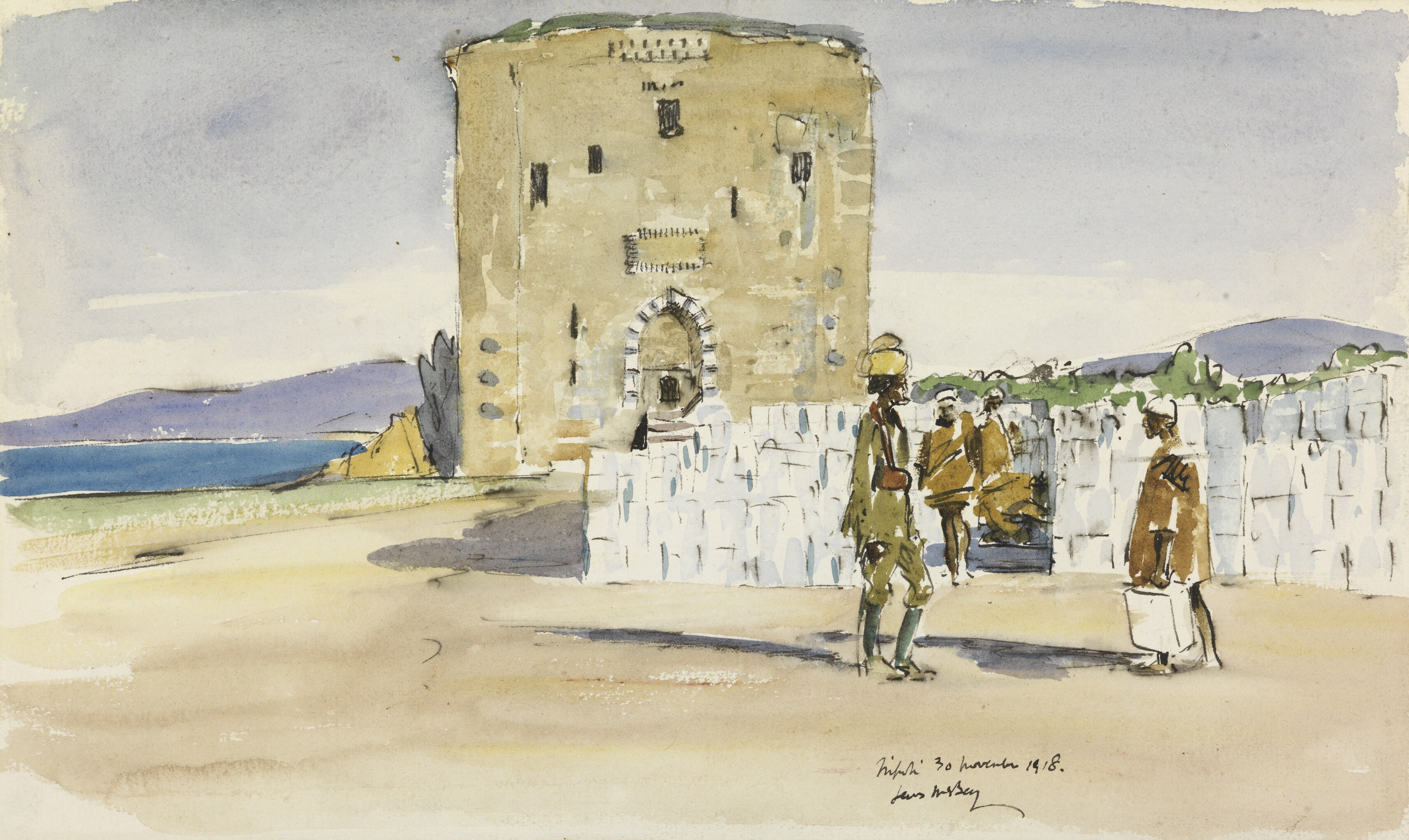
War art by James McBey, 1918. In Tripoli, Lebanon, an Indian Army soldier stands in front of piles of petrol canisters; men of the ELC collect and stack them

Egypt had been a province of the Ottoman Empire since the 1517 Ottoman conquest of egypt. However, starting in the late nineteenth century, European influence in the country began to expand as Egyptian rulers proved increasingly incapable of managing the country's financial affairs and started to borrow heavily from foreign financiers, including British businessmen. In 1882, the British conquered Egypt and in 1914 officially established a protectorate over the country, bringing Egypt into the British Empire. As part of this protectorate, the British promised to defend Egypt from Ottoman, African and European incursions and never to request their aid in future conflicts. However, the British quickly realised the importance of Egyptian labour, and started to recruit labourers among the Egyptian populace to help with the war effort in 1914.

== Scope of operations ==
Companies of the Egyptian Labour Corps were supplied to work on construction of railways and roads. They worked to manage sanitation, were employed as stevedores and on wharf construction. They loaded and unloaded lighters, carried stores for supply depots and loaded lorries for the ASC. They laid the pipelines, built the railway embankments and helped lay the track, loaded and unloaded the trains, manned the surf boats, stowed or discharged the cargoes of surf boats from supply and store ships, and were employed everywhere on conservancy duties.

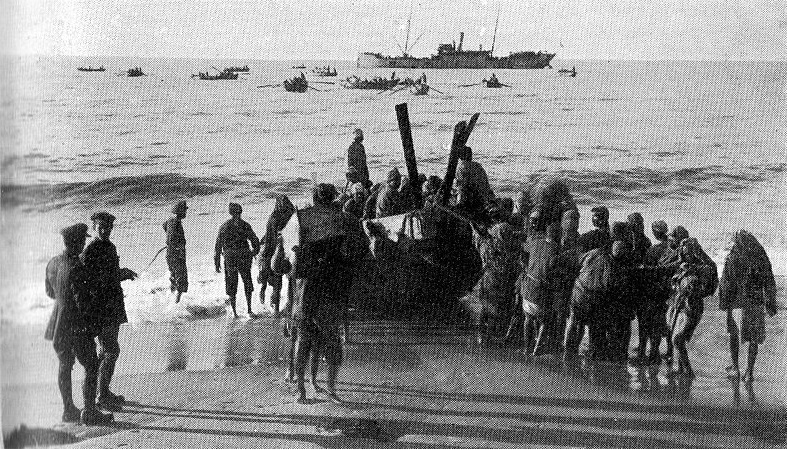
Landing stores near Gaza

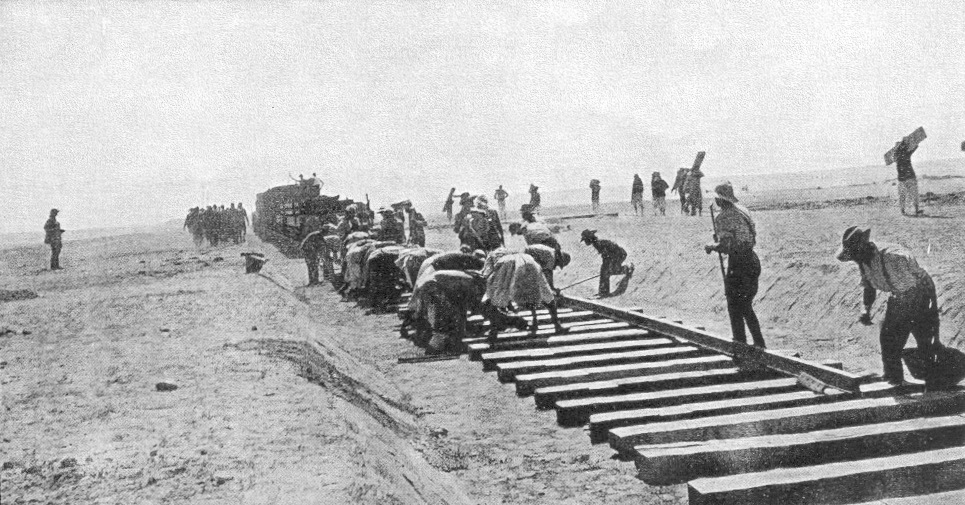
Railway Construction Team

The corps constructed the duplication of the Zagazig to Ismailia section of the railway from Cairo to the Suez Canal, built metalled roads out into the Sinai desert and laid water pipelines. About 100 miles (200 km) of railway, road and pipelines were laid in a few weeks for the forward defence of the Suez Canal before it was extended eastwards into the Sinai. They also assisted in horse and camel hospitals, and travelled to Akaba to assist Lawrence in his work for the Arab Revolt.

Beside the pipelines and the railway, hundreds of miles of wire netting roads were laid across the sand and pegged down, and great reservoirs, to hold huge quantities of water supplied by filters at a rate of 500,000 imperial gallons (2,000 m^{3}) a day, were constructed. At the beginning of December 1916, the Egyptian Expeditionary Force had a strength of 150,000 British, Australian and New Zealand and 6,000 Indian troops, and 13,000 Egyptian labourers.

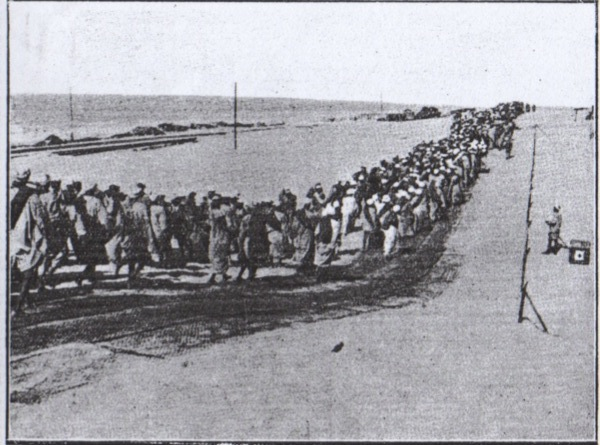
Egyptian Labour Corps moving along a Wire Netting Road

Rail was laid at the rate of 15 miles (24 km) a month and the pipeline construction eventually caught up with the railway at El Arish in February 1917. At this time General Harry Chauvel ordered aerial counter-attacks on German and Ottoman positions to stop as retaliation against German aerial attacks on the Egyptian Labour Corps, which stopped the railway gangs from continuing the strategically vital railway on to Rafah.

Under the supervision of administrative officers of corps, divisions and sanitary sections, troops worked alongside the Egyptian Labour Corps in the fight against pests in the Jordan Valley. This involved, among other strategies, draining swamps, and constructing hard horse standings. Near Jericho in 1918 a 600-strong company of the Egyptian Labour Corps worked for two months to suppress mosquitoes breeding in the overflow from the Ain es Sultan spring.

== Recruitment ==
This was carried out by Egyptian agents who visited villages in their sub-district under the direction of a district recruiting officer who was assisted by a medical officer. These two officers inspected and examined all recruits and the agent was paid 5 piastres for each recruit who passed. Each successful recruit could choose between Camel Transport, Horse Transport, Labour, Remount and Veterinary corps and services. The recruits enlisted for six months and were given an advance of English £3/-/- to provide for dependents. At the Recruiting Depot the recruit was issued with blankets and an overcoat and at the corps or service depot he was disinfected, given clothes and equipment. In the Egyptian Labour Corps the pay was 5 piastres per day while the other corps and services paid 6 piastres per day plus clothing and rations.

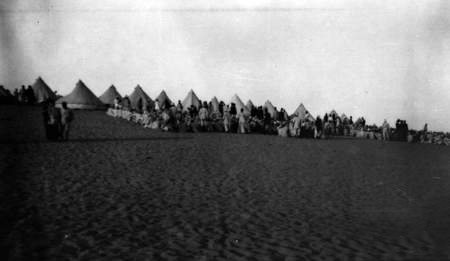
Egyptian Labour Corps engaged on road making, railway construction and laying water pipeline being paid at Romani in September 1916

These men were most often from extremely poor villagers and the daily inducement of 7 piastres (1 shilling and 6 pence) and rations was very attractive to them. When money and food were not enough, military authority under the terms of the protectorate was imposed over all Egyptian officials and civilians. Then the Muidir, Lord Lieutenant or Omdah, mayors of Egyptian towns would organise press gangs and the necessary number of armed guards to watch over the labourers.

It is also probable that members of the Egyptian Labour Corps were 'sealed' like members of the Egyptian Camel Transport Corps by a seal being attached to their wrists. Initially the periods of service appear to have started as quite short term but became very long term as their importance was recognised and the difficulty of finding more recruits increased. By the first half of 1918 riots, blamed on bad recruitment methods employed to find more workers for the Egyptian Labour Corps, began to occur.

Sir Reginald Wingate acknowledged on 8 May, the importance to General Edmund Allenby of keeping the Egyptian Labour Corps and the Egyptian Camel Transport Corps at full strength. At first Wingate contemplated "some form of compulsory service" but such a step would not be supported by the Sultan of Egypt and cause deep resentment throughout the country. A meeting at the Residency, in Cairo, decided that requisitioning labour from the villages through the Mudirs, Mamours and Omdas might prove effective. The meeting felt this corvée system would be supported by the Sultan and his Ministers and could be introduced without causing discontent among the general population.

== Organisation ==
Enclosed are copies of a letter from me to the W.O. [War Office], and the cabled reply. The Egyptian native personnel referred to are subject only to the Army Act. Flogging is, therefore, illegal. Everyone who knows the country [Egypt] considers power of flogging to be necessary. The general behaviour of the Egyptian Labour Corps is very good; but there are now and then cases for the lash. Do you think that it could be specially legalised ...?

— General Allenby letter to Robertson of 4 December 1917

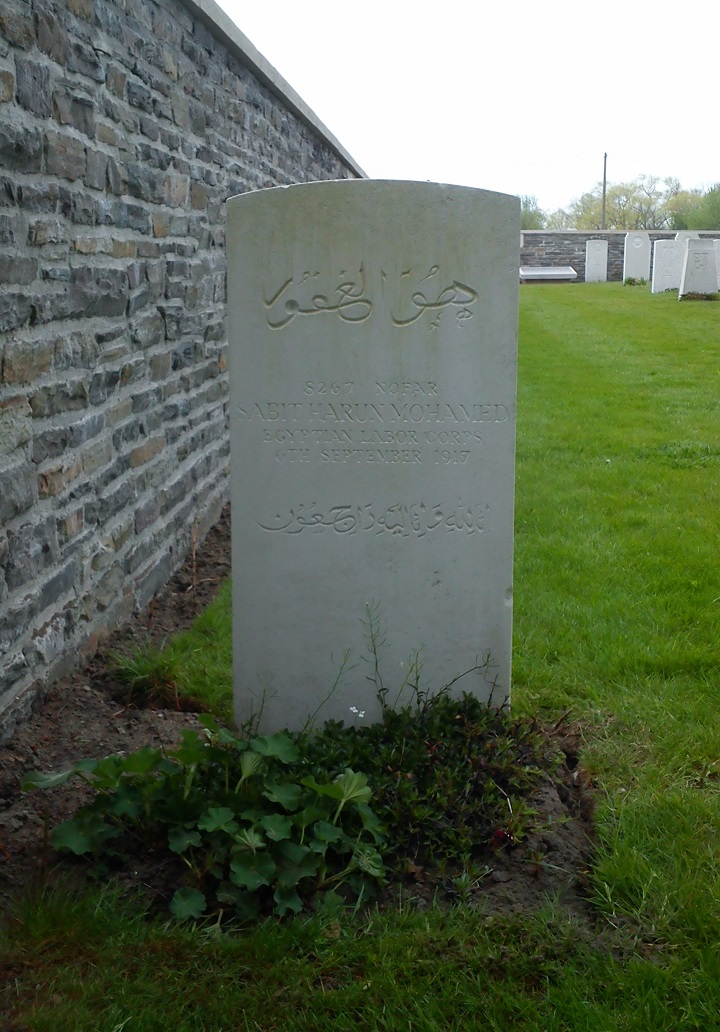
Grave of Sabit Harun Mohamed, Egyptian Labour Corps, in Adinkerke Military Cemetery, Belgium

The number of workers recruited into the Egyptian Labour Corps was half a million workers from Upper Egypt between 1914 and 1918, mainly organized into companies with 12 gangs forming one company. The gang was the working unit consisting of 50 men with a headman, often all belonging to one home village. These men often sang while they worked and this was thought to be an indication that they were happy, but one Egyptian chant sung by the workers was, "Kam Lelah, Kam Youm?" (Egyptian Arabic: كم ليلة كم يوم) which translates as "How many nights, how many days?"

The Egyptian Labour Corps was described in February 1918 as organised into companies of 600 men with a subaltern commanding officer and two junior officers. Three to six of these companies formed a Camp under an officer commanding Egyptian Labour Corps of an Area. The officers were at first drawn from Arabic speaking Anglo-Egyptians and afterwards NCOs and privates were recruited from British units and trained in Arabic. Their level of proficiency was recognised by a special rate of extra duty pay. Supervision was provided by the reis of each gang and by civilian foremen who were paid from English £1/10/- to English £15/-/- per month. These civilian foremen were graded as 'NCO Foremen' provided with a uniform and treated as acting Non-commissioned officers of the ELC.

Half a million fellahin from Upper Egypt were recruited into this corps.

== Acknowledgement ==
The great value of the service of the Egyptian Labour Corps was acknowledged by Edmund Allenby in his despatch of 16 December 1917 where he mentions the great value and importance of their service, their steadiness under fire and devotion to duty under difficult conditions.
