= Outline of World War I =

Overview of and topical guide to World War I

The following outline is provided as an overview of and topical guide to World War I:

World War I – major war centred in Europe that began on 27 July lasted until 11 November 1918. It involved all the world's great powers, which were assembled in two opposing alliances: the Allies (centred on the Triple Entente of Britain, France and Russia) and the Central Powers (originally centred on the Triple Alliance of Germany, Austria-Hungary and Italy). More than 70 million military personnel, including 60 million Europeans, were mobilised in one of the largest wars in history. More than 9 million combatants were killed, largely because of great technological advances in firepower without corresponding advances in mobility. It was the sixth deadliest conflict in world history, subsequently paving the way for various political changes such as revolutions in the nations involved.

== Nature of World War I ==
World War I can be described as all of the following:

- War
  - Total war
  - World war

World War I was further characterized by the following types of warfare:

- Aerial warfare
- Armoured warfare
- Asymmetric warfare (in some cases)
- Attrition warfare
- Chemical warfare
- Ground warfare
- Modern warfare
- Naval warfare
  - Submarine warfare
    - Antisubmarine warfare
    - Unrestricted submarine warfare
- Trench warfare

== Causes of World War I ==
=== Long term influences leading to World War I ===
Cultural and strategic factors:

- Militarism
- Alliances:
- Diplomatic history of World War I
  - The Central Powers
    - Dual Alliance (Germany and Austria-Hungary)
    - Triple Alliance (1882) (Germany, Austria-Hungary and Italy)
  - The Allies
    - Franco-Russian Alliance (1894)
    - Entente Cordiale between France and the British
    - Anglo-Russian Entente of 1907
    - Triple Entente
  - Treaty of London, 1839, about the neutrality of Belgium
  - German Imperial War Council of 8 December 1912
- Imperialism
- Nationalism
- Cult of the offensive – Considerations of the advantage of striking first.
  - Preventive war

Destabilizing of the European balance of power:

- Balkanization
- Tensions between Austria and Serbia
  - May Overthrow
  - Pig War
  - Bosnian crisis
- Tensions between Russia and Austria
  - Campaign in and annexation of Bosnia by Austria-Hungary
  - First Balkan War
  - Second Balkan War
- Tensions between France and Germany
  - Franco-Prussian War (1870–1871) – brought the establishment of a powerful and dynamic Germany, causing what was seen as a displacement or unbalancing of power
- Tensions between the United Kingdom and Germany
  - Naval arms race between the United Kingdom and the German Empire
- Tensions between Italy and Austria
  - Annexation of Bosnia by Austria-Hungary

=== Short term influences leading to World War I ===
- Assassination of Archduke Franz Ferdinand of Austria
- July Crisis
- British entry into World War I
- French entry into World War I
- German entry into World War I
- Japanese entry into World War I

== Participants in World War I ==
World War I was fought between the Allies and the Central Powers.

=== The Central Powers (Triple Alliance) ===
- German Empire
- Austria-Hungary
- Ottoman Empire
- Bulgaria

=== The Allies (Triple Entente) ===
==== Main Allied countries ====
- (France) French Third Republic (including colonial forces)
- (British Empire) United Kingdom (including colonial forces)
- Russian Empire (until March 1917 (Note: Since Russia was using the Julian calendar, the date was February in Russia, but March for countries using the Gregorian calendar))
  - (Russia) Russian Republic (March 1917 - November 1917)
  - Soviet Russia (November 1917 - March 1918)
- Kingdom of Serbia
- Kingdom of Italy (Note: Italy was part of the Triple Alliance (1882) with Germany and Austria-Hungary, but due to tensions declared neutrality when war broke out, and later left the alliance on May 3rd) (from May 1915) (including colonial forces)
- Kingdom of Belgium (including colonial forces)
- United States of America (after April 1917)

==== Other military allies ====
Other states that had military participation:

- Kingdom of Montenegro
- Empire of Japan
- (Portugal) Portuguese Republic (March 1916 and after) (including Portuguese colonial forces)
- Kingdom of Romania (August 1916 – May 1918, November 1918)
- Kingdom of Greece (November 1916 for the Government of National Defence; June 1917 for the whole country)
- Albania
- Brazil (October 1917 and after)
- Armenia (May 1918 and after)
- (Bohemia) Czechoslovakia – See Czechoslovak Legions
- Nepal (soldiers served under the British Indian Army)
- (Thailand) Kingdom of Siam
- San Marino (June 1915 and after)
- Sweden (June 1914-early 1916) (1918)

==== Nominal Allies ====
States that declared war, but had no military involvement:

- Andorra
- Bolivia (April 1917 and after)
- China (August 1917 and after)
- Costa Rica (May 1918 and after)
- Cuba (April 1917 and after)
- Ecuador (December 1917 and after)
- Guatemala (April 1918 and after)
- Liberia (August 1917 and after)
- Haiti (July 1918 and after)
- Honduras (July 1918 and after)
- Nicaragua (May 1918 and after)
- Panama (December 1917 and after)
- Peru (October 1917 and after)
- Uruguay (October 1917 and after)

== Conduct of the war ==
- Allied declarations of war
- British propaganda during World War I
- Convoys in World War I
- German occupation of Luxembourg in World War I
- Roosevelt's World War I volunteers
- Strategic bombing during World War I
  - German strategic bombing during World War I
- World War I conscription in Australia
- World War I naval arms race
- United States Navy operations during World War I
- Military engagements of World War I

=== World War I theatres, fronts, and campaign ===
- South Arabia during World War I
- Western Front (World War I)
- Eastern Front (World War I)
- West Africa Campaign (World War I)
- East African Campaign (World War I)
- Italian Campaign (World War I)
- Sinai and Palestine Campaign
- Caucasus Campaign
- Mesopotamian Campaign
- Gallipoli Campaign
- Attacks on North America during World War I

=== Naval campaigns of World War I ===
- Battle of the Atlantic (1914-1918)
- Adriatic Campaign of World War I
- Naval operations in the Dardanelles Campaign
- Blockade of Germany

== World War I by country ==
=== Central Powers ===
- Austria-Hungary during World War I
  - Hungary in World War I
  - Poland during World War I
- Bulgaria during World War I
- Germany during World War I
  - German East Africa during World War I
  - Poland during World War I
- Ottoman Empire during World War I
  - Aliyah and yishuv during World War I
  - Armenia in World War I
    - Western Armenia
    - Armenians in the Ottoman Empire
    - Armenian notables deported from Constantinople in 1915
    - Armenian genocide
      - See also Armenian genocide recognition
    - Armenian resistance (1914–1918)
      - Administration for Western Armenia
        - Armenian irregular units
    - Armenian volunteer units
    - Armenian casualties during World War I
  - Seyfo
  - Greek genocide
  - Deportations of Kurds (1916–1934)
  - Prosecution of Ottoman war criminals after World War I

=== Allies ===
==== Main allies ====
- Serbia during World War I
- France during World War I
  - Summary
  - French foreign policy and the outbreak of the First World War
  - French Army in World War I
  - French villages destroyed in the First World War
- Russia during World War I – food shortages in the major urban centres, and poor morale due to lost battles and heavy losses sustained, brought about civil unrest which led to the February Revolution, the abdication of the Tsar, and the end of the Russian Empire.
  - Russian Revolution (1917) – end of Imperial Russia
    - February Revolution –
      - Russian Provisional Government –
    - October Revolution – beginning of the Soviet Union
  - Poland during World War I
  - Finland during World War I
    - Grand Duchy of Finland
    - Finnish Declaration of Independence
  - Ukraine during World War I
- British Empire during World War I
  - United Kingdom during World War I
  - Australia during World War I
    - Australian women during World War I
  - India in World War I
  - Canada during World War I
  - Newfoundland during World War I
  - New Zealand in World War I
  - South Africa in World War I
    - South African Overseas Expeditionary Force
  - Southern Rhodesia in World War I
  - Hong Kong during World War I
- Italy in World War I
- United States in World War I
  - Puerto Ricans in World War I

==== Other allies ====
- Albania during World War I
- Brazil during World War I
- Czechoslovaks in World War I
  - Czechoslovak Legions
- Greece during World War I
- Japan during World War I
- Montenegro during World War I
- Nepal during World War I
- Portugal during World War I
- Romania during World War I
- Siam during World War I
- San Marino during World War I

==== Nominal allies ====
- Andorra during World War I
- Bolivia during World War I
- China during World War I
- Costa Rica during World War I
- Cuba during World War I
- Ecuador during World War I
- Guatemala during World War I
- Liberia during World War I
- Haiti during World War I
- Honduras during World War I
- Panama during World War I
- Peru during World War I
- Uruguay during World War I

=== World War I impact on neutral countries ===
- Norway in World War I
  - Espionage in Norway during World War I
- Mexico in World War I
- Ireland and World War I
- Montserrat in World War I
- Spain in World War I
- Switzerland during the World Wars - Switzerland did declare a "state of siege".
- Vietnam during World War I
- Afghanistan – received a German diplomatic mission trying to convince it to act against the British in India
- Argentina – Ally to US by treaty (see ABC countries for more information)
- Bhutan
- Chile – Ally to US by treaty (see ABC countries for more information)
- Colombia
- Denmark – Traded with both sides.
- El Salvador
- Ethiopian Empire – received a German diplomatic mission trying to convince it to act against the British in Africa
- Liechtenstein – Had a customs and monetary union with Austria-Hungary.
- Luxembourg – Never declared war on the Central Powers despite being invaded and occupied by Germany.
- Mongolia
- Mexico- Declined an alliance with Germany (see Zimmermann Telegram). An ally to the United States by treaty (see ABC countries).
- Netherlands – An ally of the United Kingdom by treaty. Traded with both sides.
- Norway – Gave naval assistance to the United Kingdom.
- Paraguay
- Persia – Occupied by British and Russian troops.
- Spain – Also treaty bound ally to the United Kingdom.
- Sweden during World War I – Financially supported Germany.
- Venezuela – Supplied the Allies with oil.

== People in World War I ==
=== Leaders in World War I ===
- Allied leaders of World War I
- Leaders of the Central Powers of World War I

== Military forces of World War I ==
=== Allies ===
- List of formations of the United States Army during World War I
  - List of American aero squadrons
- List of Australian divisions in World War I
- List of British armies in World War I
  - List of British corps in World War I
  - List of British divisions in World War I
  - British Land Units of the First World War
  - Royal Flying Corps
- List of Canadian divisions in World War I
- List of French armies in World War I
- List of Indian divisions in World War I
- List of Italian armies in World War I
- Imperial Russian Army formations and units (1914)
  - List of Russian armies in World War I
- Royal Serbian Army

=== Central powers ===
- Austro-Hungarian Armed Forces
  - Austro-Hungarian Army
  - Austro-Hungarian Navy
  - Austro-Hungarian Air Force
- Military of the Ottoman Empire
  - Ottoman Army
  - Ottoman Navy
  - Ottoman Air Force
- Imperial German Army
  - Field armies of Germany in World War I
  - List of Imperial German infantry regiments
  - Luftstreitkräfte
  - Schutztruppe
- Imperial German Navy
  - Seebataillon

== Technology during World War I ==
=== Equipment of World War I ===
==== Vehicles of World War I ====
- List of military aircraft of Central Powers in WWI
- List of military aircraft of Entente Powers in WWI
- List of aircraft of the Royal Flying Corps
- List of aircraft of the Royal Naval Air Service
- List of military aircraft of Germany

==== Weapons of World War I ====
List of infantry weapons of World War I

- British Army uniform and equipment in World War I
- Chemical weapons in World War I
- List of German weapons of World War I
- Romanian military equipment of World War I

== Common military awards ==
=== Russian Empire ===
- Cross of St. George
- Order of St. George
- Order of Saint Vladimir
- Order of Saint Anna

=== United States ===
United States service medals of the World Wars

- American Campaign Medal
- Air Medal
- Asiatic-Pacific Campaign Medal
- Bronze Star
- Distinguished Flying Cross
- European-African-Middle Eastern Campaign Medal
- Medal of Honor
- Silver Star
- World War I Victory Medal

=== British Empire ===
- Air Force Cross, from June 1918
- Distinguished Flying Cross
- Military Cross
- Military Medal
- Order of the Bath
- Order of the British Empire
- Victoria Cross
- 1914 Star

=== France and Belgium ===
- Commemorative war medal
- Croix de Guerre
- Dardanelles campaign medal
- Orient campaign medal

=== Imperial Germany ===
- House Order of Hohenzollern
- Iron Cross
- Order of the Red Eagle
- Pour le Mérite also known as the "Blue Max"

=== Kingdom of Serbia ===
- Order of Karađorđe's Star

=== Austria-Hungary ===
- Military Order of Maria Theresa
- Military Merit Cross

== War Crimes ==
The First World War saw many instances of war crimes being committed by both the Allied and Central powers:

=== Genocides ===
- Armenian genocide
- Outline of the Armenian genocide
- Greek genocide
- Outline of the Greek genocide

=== Massacres ===
- Massacres of Albanians in World War I
- Rape of Belgium
- Siege of Tsingtao
- Štip massacre
- Surafend massacre
- Surdulica massacre

=== Terrorism ===
- List of German-sponsored acts of terrorism during World War I

=== Mistreatment of civilians ===
- Raid on Scarborough, Hartlepool and Whitby
- Turnip Winter

== The end of World War I ==
- Armistice of Salonica (September 29, 1918) - surrender of Bulgaria
- Armistice of Mudros (October 30, 1918) – surrender of the Ottoman Empire
- Armistice of Villa Giusti (November 3, 1918) – surrender of Austria-Hungary
- Armistice with Germany (November 11, 1918) – surrender of Germany

== Aftermath of World War I ==
- World War I reparations
- Dissolution of the Austro-Hungarian Empire into several successor states:
  - Czechoslovakia
  - Yugoslavia
  - First Republic of Austria
  - Hungarian Democratic Republic
  - Second Polish Republic
- Cession by Austria-Hungary of Transylvania and Bukovina to Romania.
- Cession by Austria-Hungary of the southern half of the County of Tyrol and Trieste to Italy
- Establishment of the First Republic of Armenia
- Further Balkanization
- World War II
  - World War I was one of the main causes of World War II

== World War I-related media ==
- List of books about World War I
- List of World War I films
- World War I in literature
- World War I in popular culture

=== Non-fiction ===
- Germany's Aims in the First World War

=== Fiction ===
- Fiction based on World War I

== World War I remembered ==
- World War I reenactment
- WWI memorials
  - World War I Memorial (Berwick, Pennsylvania)
  - World War I Memorial (Atlantic City, New Jersey)
  - World War I Memorial (East Providence, Rhode Island)
  - Monument aux Parisiens morts pendant la Première Guerre mondiale (Monument to Parisians Who Died in the First World War)
- WWI veterans

== See also ==
- Timeline of World War I
- Opposition to World War I
- Outline of war
- Outline of World War II
