= Gerich =

Gerich is a surname. Notable people with the surname include:

- Sven Gerich (born 1974), German politician
- John Gerich (born 1947), Canadian politician
- Walter von Gerich, Finnish civil servant and later an agent in German pay during World War I
