= Đỗ Hữu Vị =

First Vietnamese aviator and fighter pilot (1883- 1916)

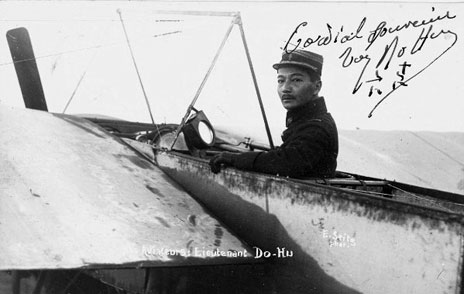
Lieutenant Đỗ Hữu Vị in a Caudron G.3 in 1915

Đỗ Hữu Vị (17 February 1883 – 9 July 1916) was the first Vietnamese aviator and fighter pilot. He served in the French Army, rising to the rank of captain. He took part in the First World War and was killed at the Battle of the Somme.

== Biography ==
Đỗ was born on February 17, 1883, in the Cholon district of Saigon, now a ward of Ho Chi Minh City, Vietnam, the fifth son of Đỗ Hữu Phương, who was the governor of Chợ Lớn. Đỗ gave his sons French education and sent them to study in Paris, to the Lycée Janson-de-Sailly then in preparatory classes at the Lycée Louis-le-Grand. Đỗ entered the Special Military School of Saint-Cyr on October 1, 1904, and joined the Centenary class of Austerlitz. He was the fourth Indochinese to enter the academy.

He was commissioned a Second Lieutenant of infantry in 1906 and assigned to the first regiment of the French Foreign Legion, participating in campaigns in North Africa. He was deployed to Oujda, Casablanca, and then Haut-Guir in Morocco from 1907 to August 1908, before fighting against guerrillas on the border with Algeria. Promoted to First Lieutenant and inspired by the achievements of Louis Blériot, he learned to fly, entering the military pilot's school in December 1910 and obtaining pilot's license no. 649 issued by the Aéro-Club de France in 1911. He returned to Morocco as a military pilot.

At the beginning of 1914, he returned to Indochina to test Lambert seaplanes on the Mekong River and to establish airbases in the colony. On October 3, 1914, Đỗ Hữu Vị asked to be transferred back to France to take part in the First World War. He then took part in numerous reconnaissance flights. In April 1915, he was caught in a storm and crashed. He spent nine days in a coma in Val-de-Grâce, with a broken left arm, jaw and skull fractured. No longer able to pilot, he briefly becomes an observer on bombing raids before requesting reassignment to the infantry. He was given command of the 7th Company in the Foreign Legion with the rank of Captain. During the Battle of the Somme, he led his men to attack Boyau de Chancelier, between Belloy-en-Santerre and Estrée on and was killed around 4 p.m. July 9, 1916. He was first buried near Dompierre with this epitaph: "Captain-aviator Do Huu, Died on the field of honor, For his country of Annam, For his homeland, France." In 1921, his brother, Colonel Đỗ Hữu Chấn, brought back his remains to rest in the ancestral plot near Cholon.

He was awarded the Morocco Commemorative Medal, the Colonial Medal, and was posthumously made a Chevalier of the Legion of Honor for being a "courageous and spirited officer" who "gloriously fell while leading his company to assault the German trenches." Streets in Casablanca, Laffaux, and in Lái Thiêu ward, Thuận An, in Bình Dương Province, Vietnam, have been named after him. A stamp featuring Đỗ Hữu Vị was issued by the French Indochinese postal service in 1930.

== See also ==
- History of Vietnam during World War I
