= Johan Søhr =

Norwegian jurist and police officer (1867–1949)

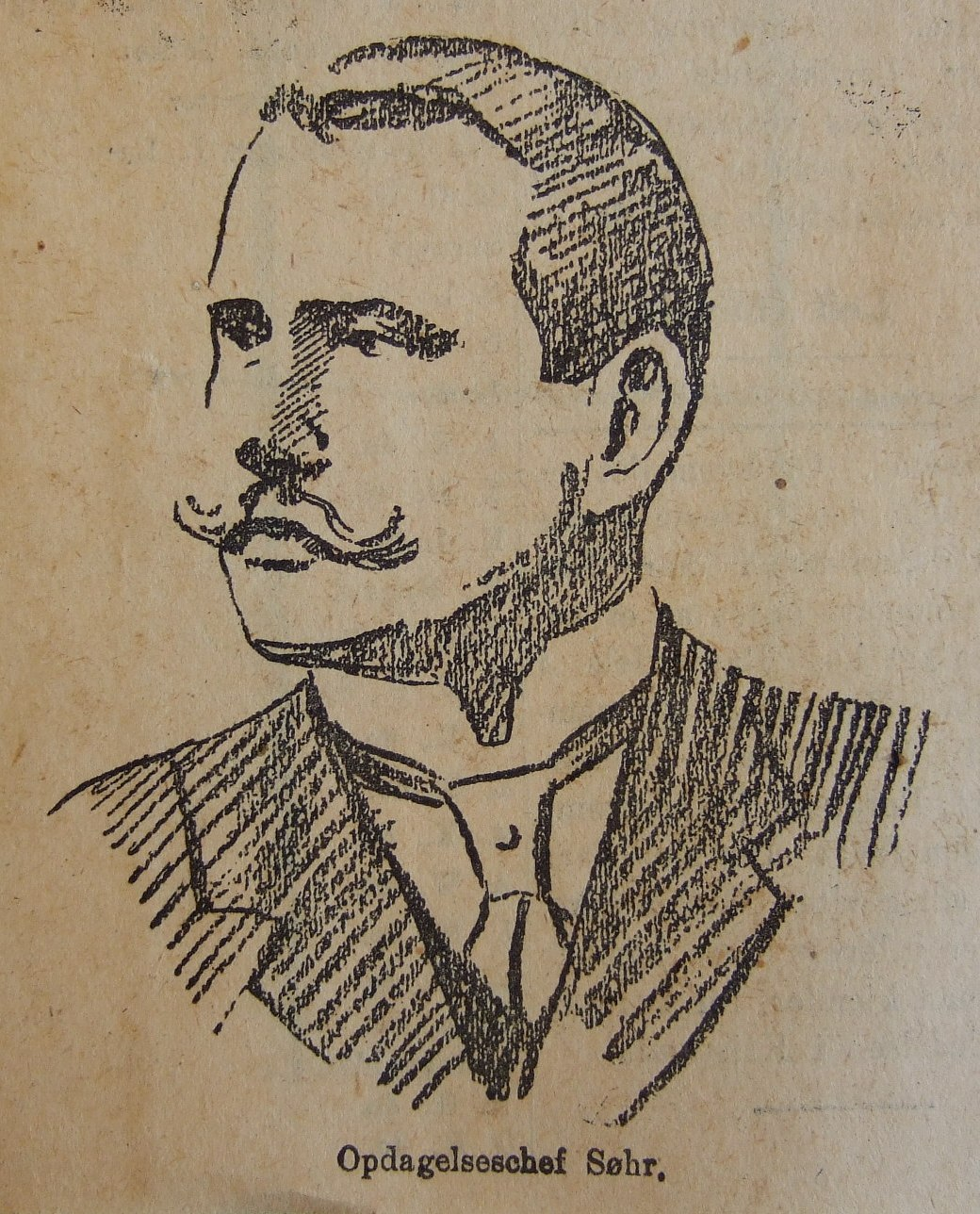
- Johan Søhr, drawing in the newspaper Tidens Tegn, 1917.
- Born: 6 September 1867; Sandøkedal Municipality, Norway
- Died: 1 January 1949 (aged 81)
- Occupations: jurist and police officer
- Awards: Order of St. Olav; Legion of Honour; Order of the Polar Star; Order of Orange-Nassau; Royal Victorian Order

Johan Olaus Søhr MVO (né Sørensen; 6 September 1867 – 1 January 1949) was a Norwegian jurist and police officer. Commonly known as Joh. Søhr.

== Personal life ==
Søhr was born in Oterøy, Sandøkedal Municipality, as the son of farmer and ship owner Johan Christian Sørensen and Ellen Kathrine Sørensen. He was married to Margit Mosgaard. In 1914 he changed his name from Sørensen to Søhr. He died in Bærum Municipality in 1949.

== Career ==
Søhr finished his secondary education in Kristiania in 1885. He studied at the Norwegian Military Academy, and then Law at the University of Kristiania, graduating as cand.jur. in 1890. His first assignments were in Søndre Bergenhus and in Østerdalen. He started working for the Kristiania Police in 1896, and as police inspector from 1906 to 1913. He was chief of the criminal department of the Kristiania Police from 1913 to 1925. During World War I he was responsible for the investigation of several espionage cases. Among these were the Otto von Rosen case, which involved confiscation of explosives, bottles with the toxin curare, and anthrax bacteria, and the Rautenfels case, when 188 kg of explosives were confiscated at the railway station Oslo Ø.

From 1925 to 1937 Søhr was Chief of Police of Aker Municipality. In 1938 he published the book Spioner og bomber. Fra opdagelsespolitiets arbeide under verdenskrigen, an account of the espionage cases during World War I. He was decorated Knight, First Class of the Royal Norwegian Order of St. Olav in 1917, and was also Knight of the Swedish Order of the Polar Star. He was decorated Knight of the French Légion d'honneur, Officer of the Dutch Order of Orange-Nassau, and received the Order of the British Empire and the Royal Victorian Order.

== Bibliography ==
- Spioner og bomber. Fra opdagelsespolitiets arbeide under verdenskrigen (in Norwegian). Oslo: Johan Grundt Tanum. 1938.
