= The Neutral Ally =

Term describing Norway in World War I

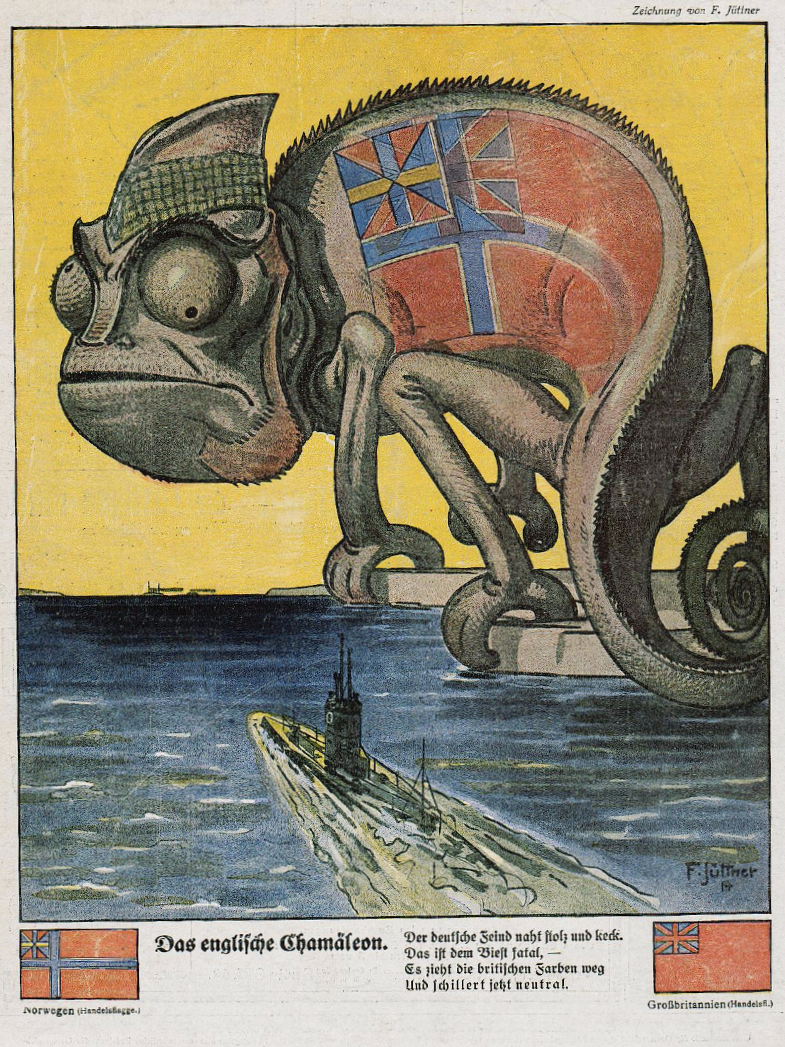
A WW1-era German propaganda poster accusing UK of disguising its ships as Norwegian during the war, justifying their Unrestricted submarine warfare.

Though Norway remained neutral during World War I, its close relations with Britain during the war has led it to be referred to as "The Neutral Ally". Norway's extensive trade links with Britain prompted the Norwegian government to favour the British in relation to Norway's large shipping fleet and vast fish supplies. The term was coined by the Norwegian historian Olav Riste in the 1960s.

In 1905, when Norway gained independence from the union between Sweden and Norway, Norwegian politicians agreed that their country should remain neutral in international conflicts. Since the great powers had no desire for unrest in Scandinavia, they signed an agreement respecting Norway's neutrality. Still, the political direction was clear: fearing Russian ambition in the north, the sentiment was that Norway should be neutral if war broke out, and rely on help from Britain, with which Norway had close relations, if attacked.

This affinity westwards was substantiated by international trade. In the early 1900s, Norway's merchant fleet was one of the largest in the world, and the country required vast supplies of oil, coal and steel to build and operate it. When war broke out in 1914, Norway was exporting great amounts of fish to both Germany and Britain, to the dismay of the latter. The Allies started overbidding on Norwegian fish stocks to prevent the Germans from purchasing them. However, Norwegian trade with Germany in other areas continued, and imports of copper ore, nickel and pyrite from Norway were vital to the German war effort. By the end of 1916, the Norwegian government was placed under heavy Allied diplomatic pressure to stop trading with Germany. Several agreements were made, though none were completely satisfying to the Allies.

On 24 December 1916, the British government issued an ultimatum, informing the Norwegian Foreign Minister Nils Claus Ihlen that British exports of coal to Norway would cease unless the Norwegians stopped trading with Germany. The Norwegian government weighed their options, and eventually agreed to stop trading with Germany. This coincided with the Imperial German Navy's expansion of unrestricted submarine warfare at the beginning of 1917. In total, 436 Norwegian merchant ships were sunk by German U-boats between 1914 and 1917, out of 847 which set sail over the course of the war. More than 1,500 Norwegian sailors died as a result of these sinkings, leading to high levels of anti-German sentiment throughout Norway. Thus, both commercial and political sympathies tied Norway and Britain together during World War I, even though the former remained officially neutral.

== Thorunn affair ==
In 1917, a German merchant ship was sighted off Langesund. To protect Norwegian territorial waters, the Royal Norwegian Navy deployed the torpedo boats Raket and Orm to intercept the merchant ship. A warning shot was fired from one of the Norwegian torpedo boats, and the German ship was ordered to sail into Langesund. Shortly afterward, a German U-boat arrived and gave orders to the German merchant ship that ran counter to those issued by Norway. Under pressure from the Norwegian torpedo boats, the German merchant ship sailed into Langesund, and the U-boat was driven off.

== See also ==
- Espionage in Norway during World War I
