= Monument aux Parisiens morts pendant la Première Guerre mondiale =

Coordinates: 48°51′40″N 2°23′19″E

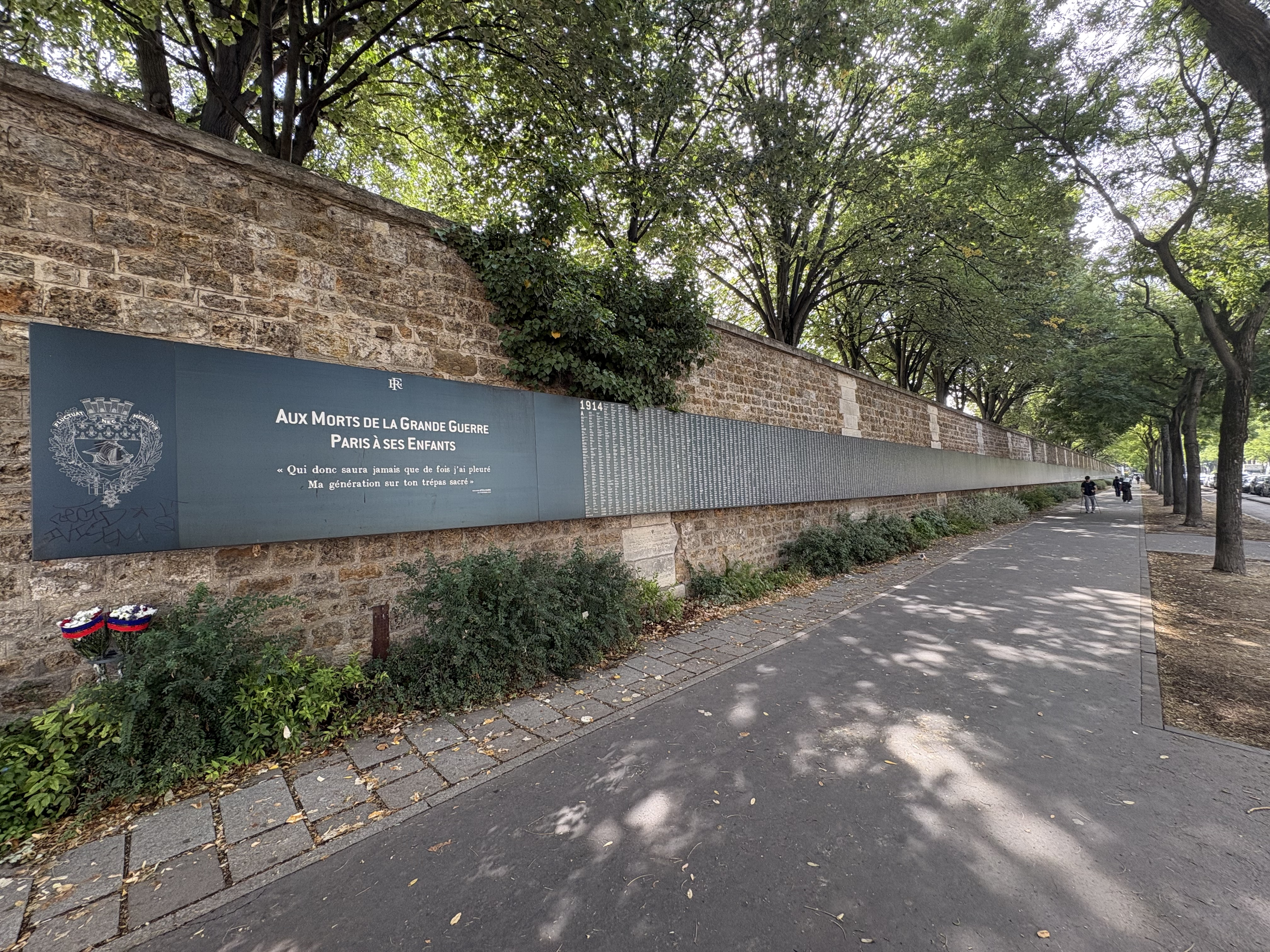
Monument to Parisians who died for France during World War I

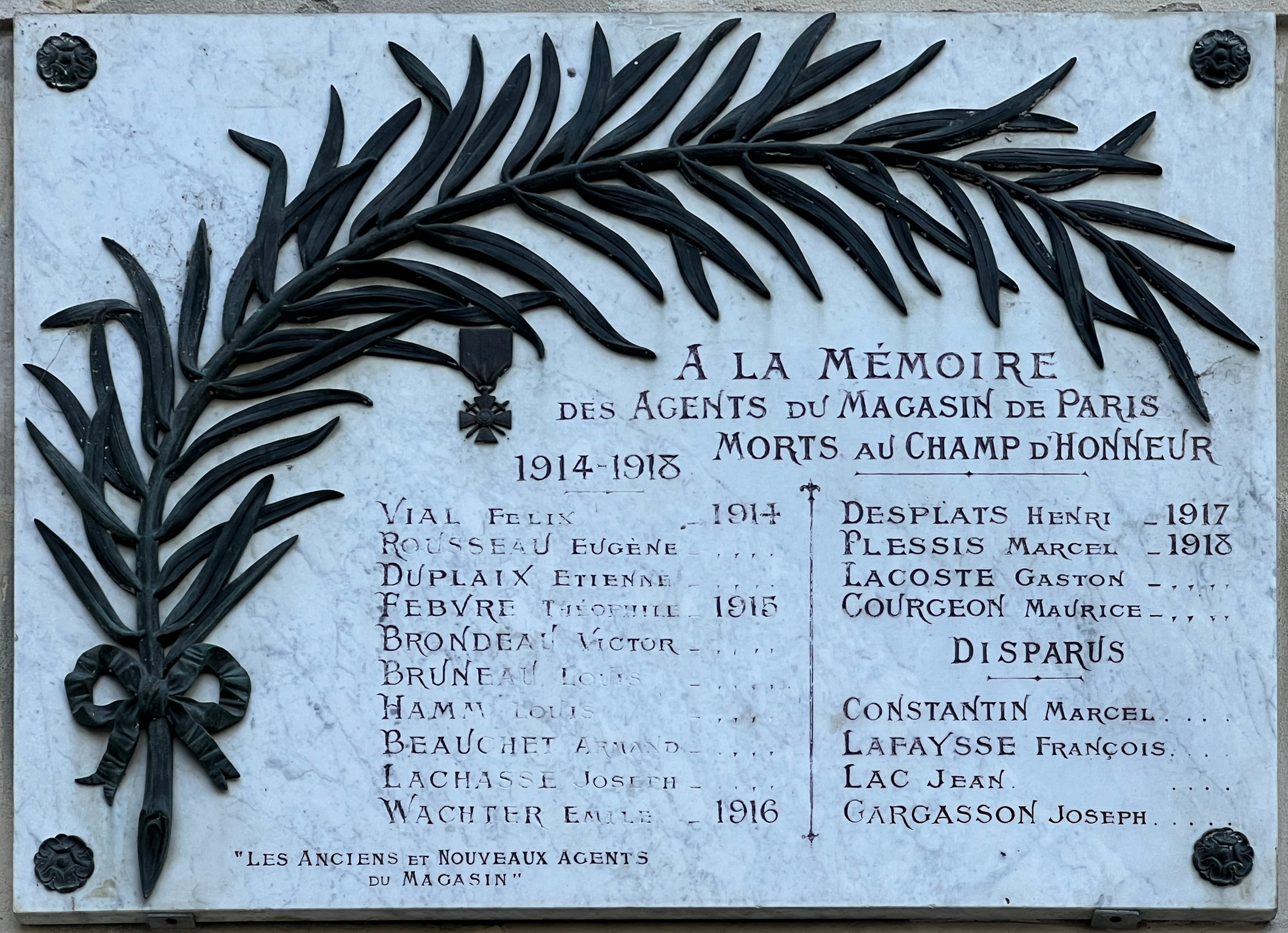
Example of a traditional and specialised Parisian World War I memorial. Located in the Gare d’Austerlitz, this plaque honors the war dead among the warehousing and logistics employees of the Compagnie du Chemin de Fer de Paris à Orléans (Railroad Company for the Paris to Orleans line).

The Monument aux Parisiens morts pendant la Première Guerre mondiale (Monument to Parisians Who Died in the First World War) lists the names of the Parisians who died in connection with military service. While there are many monuments to the fallen in Paris, this is the first monument to commemorate in a single memorial the sacrifice of Parisians from all of the city's arrondissements. It was inaugurated on 11 November 2018, on the occasion of the centenary of the Armistice.

== Overview ==
The memorial is located on the outer wall of Père Lachaise Cemetery, in the 20th arrondissement of Paris, along Boulevard de Ménilmontant. The memorial commemorates the 94,415 Parisians who died in the line of duty during the First World War. This includes approximately 8,000 other Parisians who were reported missing in action and whose bodies were never recovered. Their names are inscribed on dark-blue steel plaques extending over a length of 280 metres and standing 1.30 metres high.

The memorial fills a void in the memorial space for those who died for France during World War I. In the vast majority of towns, villages and public buildings in France, thousands of World War I memorials have been built that commemorate the heavy toll that the War inflicted on France – 1.3 million deaths in the line of duty. These memorialise the names of residents or colleagues who died for France during the conflict. Between 1918 and 1925, nearly 30,000 memorials for the Great War were erected in France. Paris has hundred of specialised memorials which list the war dead of arrondissements, schools, churches and factories. However, none of them bring together in one space all the names of the 94,415 Parisians who died defending France.

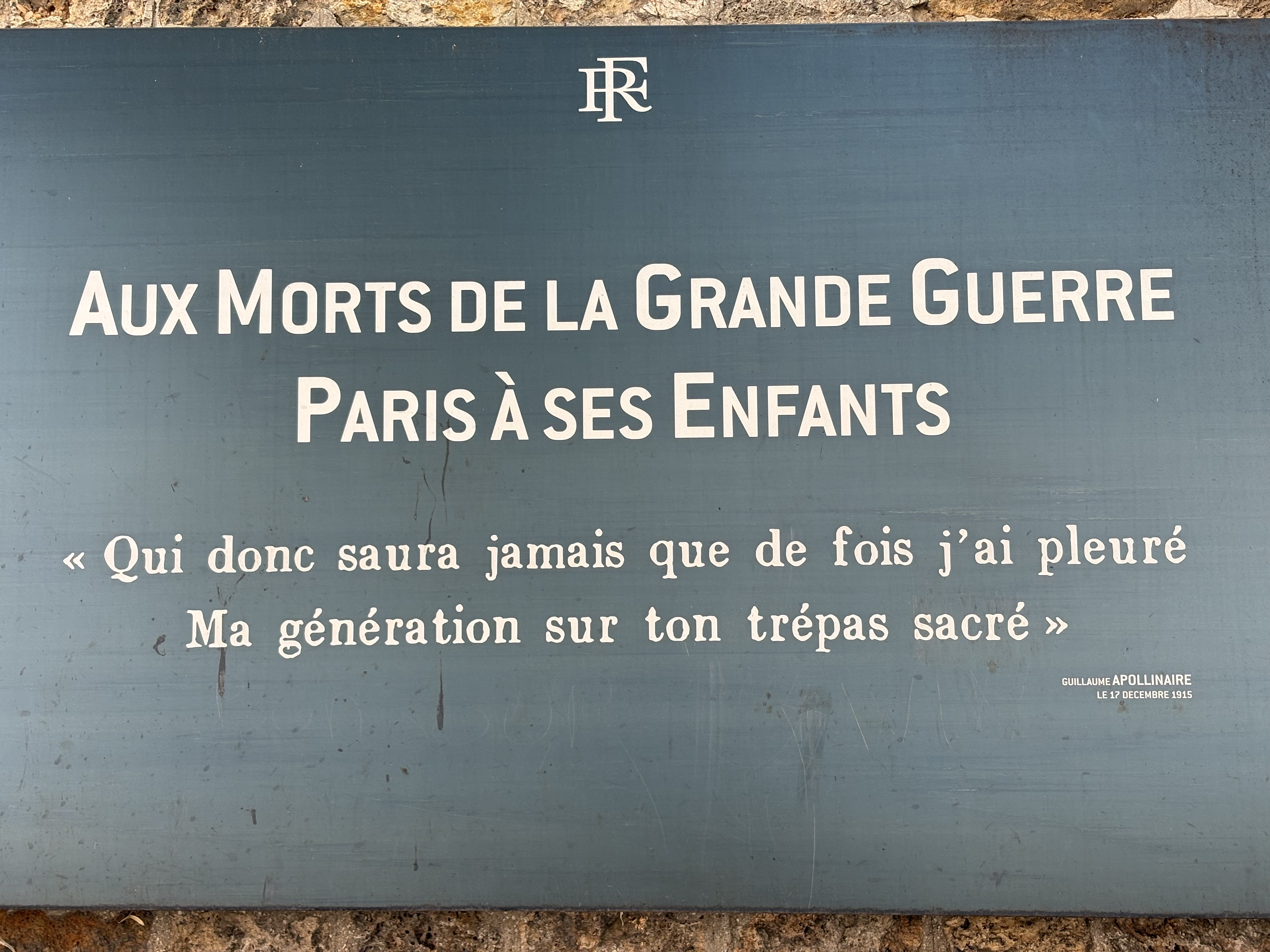
The first panel of the monument with a quote from Guillaume Apollinaire

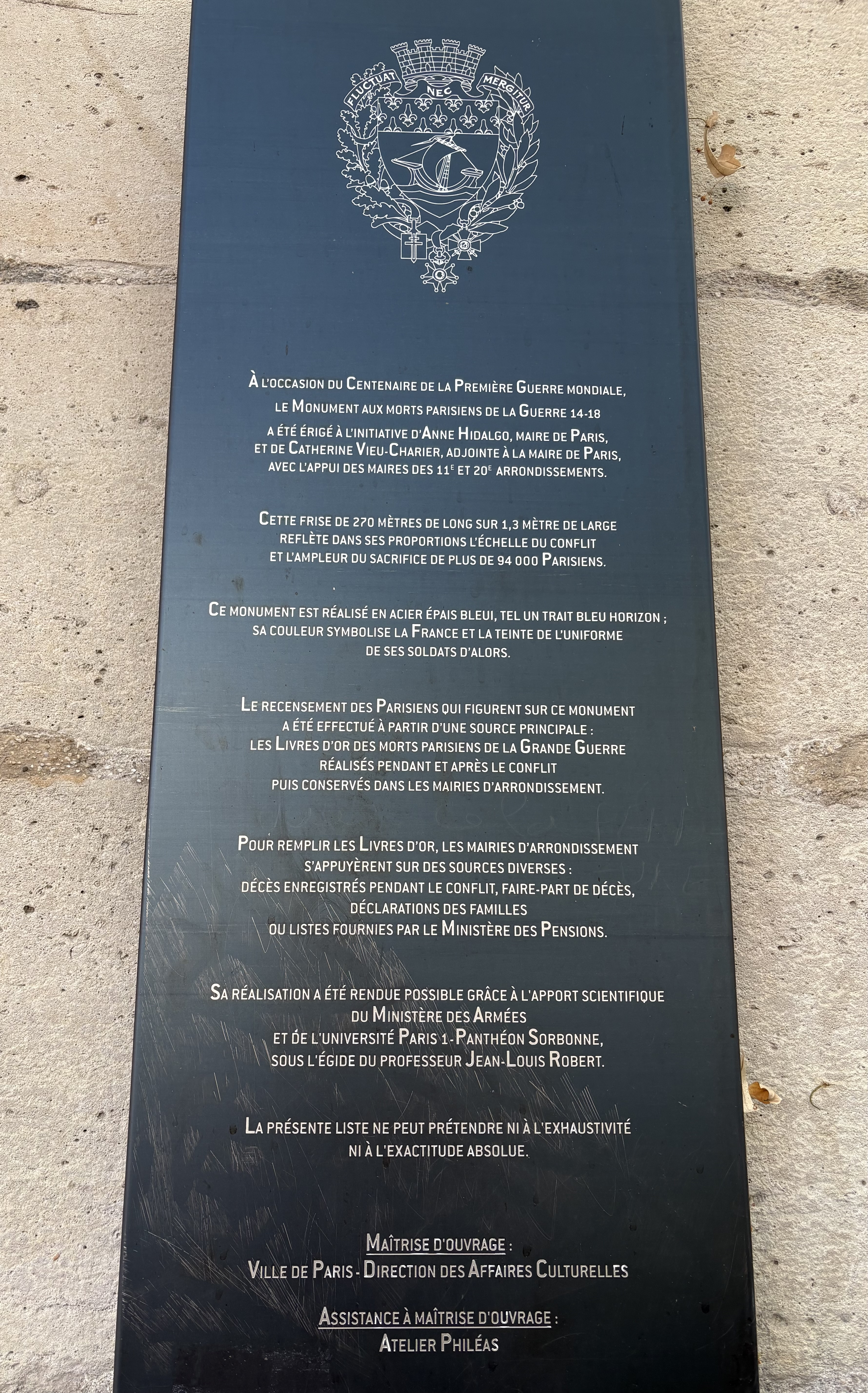
Description of the monuments and credits to its creators

Paris’ War Memorial is the first to present a complete list of the dead and missing for all of Paris. It was inaugurated by Mayor Anne Hidalgo on 11 November 2018. It bears the inscription: “To the Dead of the Great War – Paris to its children.” The opening panel also contains a quote from Guillaume Apollinaire: "Who will ever know how often I have wept for my generation, at your sacred death." The outer wall of the cemetery was chosen to symbolize the boundary between the world of the living and that of the dead.

The names of the dead are arranged chronologically, by year of death and alphabetically within each year. The years cover the period of 1914 to 1921 so that soldiers who died of their wounds after the Armistice could be included. It lists Parisians who received the designation, Mort pour la France (Died for France). Accordingly, the dead include not only direct combatants, but also military personnel who died from accidents, wounds that were not immediately lethal or sickness contracted during the War. Parisian soldiers who were executed by France for lack of zeal in fighting the enemy (for example, the soldiers executed "to set an example" during the fr:Battle of the Chemin des Dames) are included in the list.

The names of Parisians for whom the year of death could not be determined are grouped separately at the end of the memorial near the main entrance to the cemetery.

== Preparatory work and virtual memorial ==
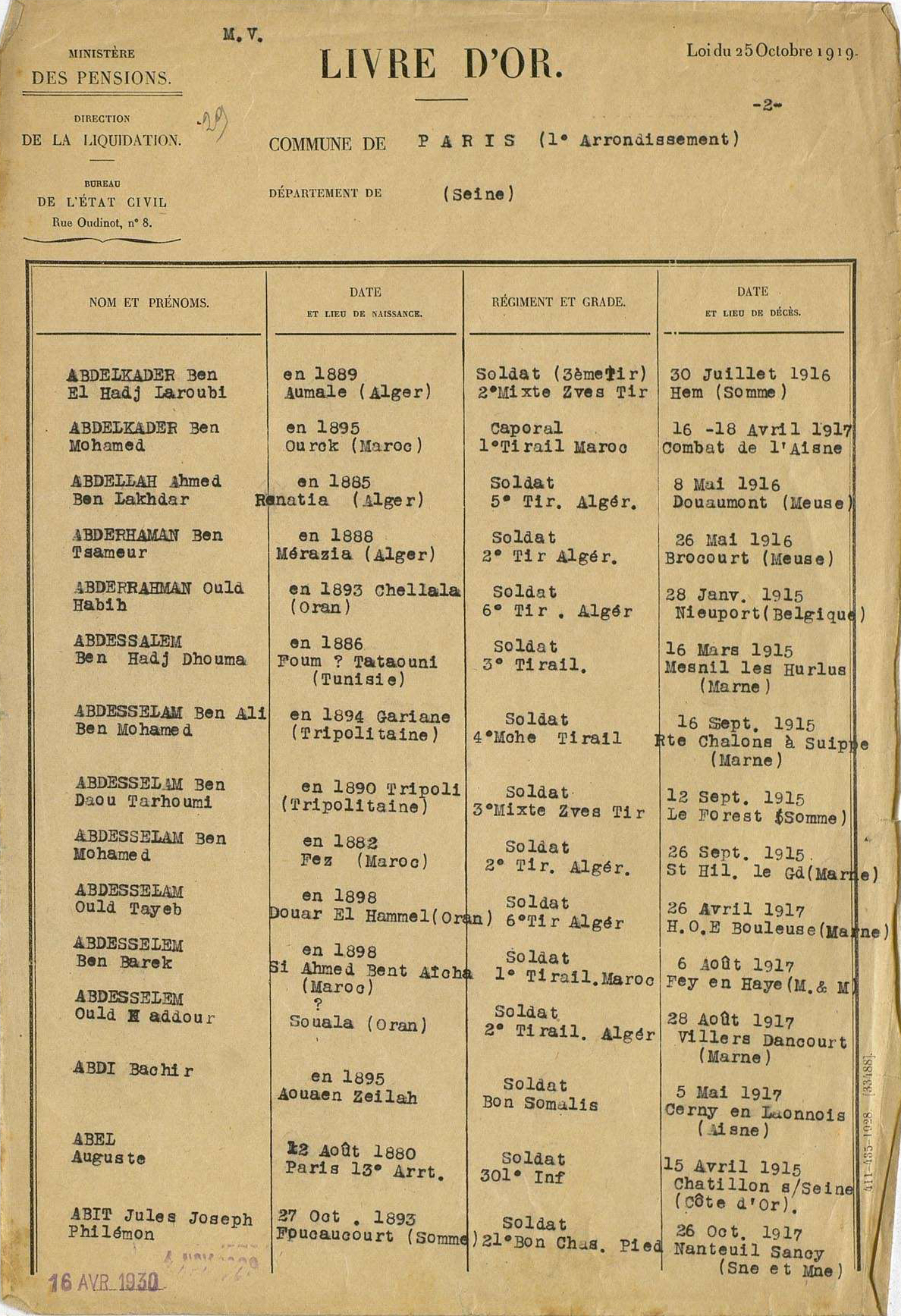
A page from the Livre d’or of the 1st arrondissement of Paris

In 2010, Professor Jean-Louis Robert and a team from Panthéon-Sorbonne University began compiling the names of soldiers who lived in Paris and were listed in the Livres d’or des morts pour la France (Books of Honour of those who died for France) from the First World War (1914–1918). These are housed in the town halls of each of Paris's twenty arrondissements, with the exception of the 3rd arrondissement (whose Livre d'or has disappeared). The researchers cross-referenced these records with the registers of war-related deaths and the burial records held by the French Army Historical Service (SGA Mémoire des hommes), as well as military service records held in the departmental archives (Archives départementales).

Professor Robert also created a virtual, on-line Great War Memorial for the City of Paris. The online memorial provides more detailed information about the dead including, where possible, their regiment, their exact date and place of death and the arrondissement in which they resided. Soldiers’ regiments are given using abbreviations, which are linked to a list of military abbreviations.

== See also ==
- List of World War I memorials and cemeteries in Artois
- List of World War I memorials and cemeteries in Champagne-Ardennes
- List of World War I memorials and cemeteries in Flanders
- List of World War I Memorials and Cemeteries in Lorraine
- List of World War I memorials and cemeteries in the Somme
- List of World War I memorials and cemeteries in Verdun
- List of World War I memorials and cemeteries in the area of the St Mihiel salie
- Outline of World War I

== References and notes ==
- Part of this article is a translation of the corresponding article in French Wikipedia: fr:Monument aux Parisiens morts pendant la Première Guerre.
