= Outline of World War II =

Overview of and topical guide to World War II

The following outline is provided as an overview of and topical guide to World War II:

World War II, or the Second World War was a global military conflict that was fought between September 1, 1939, and September 2, 1945. The war pitted two major military alliances against each other: the Allies of the United States, Soviet Union, United Kingdom, China and others against the Axis of Germany, Japan, Italy and others. Over 60 million people, the majority of them civilians, were killed, making it the deadliest conflict in human history.

The Second World War was known for modern warfare and tactics such as air warfare, strategic bombing, blitzkrieg and the first, and only, use of nuclear weapons in warfare. It is also known for the numerous war crimes committed during its duration, mostly by Axis forces but also by Allied forces, that left tens of millions of civilians dead through genocides, massacres and starvation; such as the Holocaust, Three Alls Policy, Genocide of ethnic Poles, Unit 731, Nanjing massacre, Hunger Plan and the Warsaw Uprising.

== Causes of World War II ==
- World War I
  - Treaty of Versailles
- Imperialism, expansionism and nationalism
  - Expansionist nationalism
    - Lebensraum
    - Japanese nationalism
- Events preceding World War II in Europe
  - Fascism in Europe
  - National Fascist Party
    - Benito Mussolini
  - Nazi Party
    - Adolf Hitler
- Events preceding World War II in Asia
  - Statism in Shōwa Japan
  - Japanese invasion of Manchuria
  - Xi'an Incident
  - Second Sino-Japanese War

== Participants in World War II ==
=== The Axis powers ===
==== Major Axis powers ====
- (Nazi Germany) Germany
- (Empire of Japan) Japan
- (Fascist Italy) Italy (Note: The Kingdom of Italy was an axis power until it changed sides to the Allies after an armistice in 1943. After the armistice, the Italian Social Republic was set up as a German puppet state still under Mussolini.)

==== Other Axis powers ====
- (Kingdom of Hungary (1920–1946)) Hungary
- (Kingdom of Romania) Romania
- (Slovak Republic (1939–1945)) Slovakia (Note: As the Slovak Republic, a German client state)
- Bulgaria
- (Independent State of Croatia) Croatia
- Finland (Note: During the Continuation War)

=== The Allied powers ===
==== The 'Big Five' major allies ====
- Soviet Union (Note: From June 1941)
- United States (Note: From December 1941)
- United Kingdom
- (Taiwan) China (Note: China had been fighting an undeclared war against Japan since 1937, with various other conflicts since 1931. On December 9, 1941, they officially joined the war)
- France (Note: In June 1940, France surrendered and a government-in-exile, Free France, was formed that fought with the Allies until the Provisional government was formed in 1944)

==== Other major allies ====
- Poland
- (Kingdom of Yugoslavia) Yugoslavia (Note: Yugoslavia was occupied after an invasion, but there were prominent partisan groups that continued fighting)
- Greece
- Canada
- Netherlands
- Belgium
- Czechoslovakia
- (British Raj) India
- Australia

== People in World War II ==
=== Leaders in World War II ===
==== Axis leaders ====
- (Nazi Germany) Adolf Hitler – Führer (leader) of Germany
- (Empire of Japan) Hirohito – Emperor (Note: The emperor was the titular leader of Japan and had the final say on decisions, but his power was still (somewhat) limited. The Prime Minister (Fumimaro Konoe and later Hideki Tojo for most of the war) held immense political power, and thus the emperor was not a dictator in the way Hitler or Mussolini were) of Japan
- (Fascist Italy) Benito Mussolini – Prime Minister and Duce (Note: Victor Emmanuel III was the Italian head of state and did overrule Mussolini on certain occasions (such as refusing to join the Second World War until 1940 and even deposing him in 1943), but Mussolini used more de facto power and influence than the king) of Italy

==== Allied leaders ====
- Joseph Stalin – Leader (Note: Stalin was neither the head of state nor the head of government, but he held de facto dictatorial power) of the Soviet Union
- Franklin D. Roosevelt (Note: Harry S. Truman from April 1945) – President of the United States
- Winston Churchill (Note: Neville Chamberlain until May 10th 1940 and Clement Attlee from July 1945) – Prime Minister of the United Kingdom
- (Republic of China (1912–1949)) Chiang Kai-shek – Leader (Note: China was fragmented at the time due to a halted civil war and legacies of the warlord era; thus, other leaders such as Mao Zedong of the Chinese Communists and various warlords (such as Li Zongren, Yan Xishan and (initially) Zhang Xueliang) had significant power. However, Kai-shek was the leader of the nationalists which allied with the communists and controlled most of China during the Second World War) of China

=== Military forces of World War II ===
- List of World War II aces by country
- List of World War II air aces

==== British Army during the Second World War ====
- History of the Royal Navy
- British Army Groups in WWII
- British Corps in World War II List of British Commonwealth divisions in the Second World War
  - Canada in World War II
  - Indian Army during World War II

===== Military history of France during World War II =====
- Army of Africa
- French Liberation Army
- French Expeditionary Corps
- Armistice Army (Vichy)
- Vichy French Air Force
- Milice (French Militia)

===== Military history of the United States during World War II =====
- List of formations of the United States Army during World War II
- United States Navy in World War II
- United States Army Air Forces
- American Minority Groups in World War II

===== Military history of the Soviet Union =====
- Red Army
- Military units and formations of the Soviet Union in World War II
- Field armies of the Soviet Union

===== National Revolutionary Army =====
- Army groups of the National Revolutionary Army

===== Military history of Germany =====
- Wehrmacht
  - Heer
  - Luftwaffe
  - Kriegsmarine
- Waffen-SS
  - Gestapo
- Afrika Korps (DAK)
- List of German divisions in World War II

===== Military history of Japan =====
- Imperial Japanese Armed Forces
- Imperial Japanese Army
  - Imperial Japanese Army Air Service
- Imperial Japanese Navy
  - Imperial Japanese Navy Air Service
  - Imperial Japanese Navy Land Forces
- List of Japanese Infantry divisions

===== Military history of Italy during World War II =====
- List of Italian divisions in World War II
- Royal Italian Army
- Regia Marina
- Regia Aeronautica
- Blackshirts (MVSN)

== Timeline of World War II ==
The following list includes some of the largest events in World War II:

=== 1939 ===
- August 23: Germany and the Soviet Union sign a non-aggression pact
  - September 1: Germany (Note: And Slovakia) invades Poland, beginning the war (Note: Other dates have been proposed, but September 1, 1939, is generally accepted)
  - September 3: War is declared on Germany by the United Kingdom and France, the Battle of the Atlantic and Phoney War begins
  - September 17: After the Soviet Union defeats Japan in Mongolia, they invade Poland as well
- November 30: The Soviet Union invades Finland

=== 1940 ===
- April 9: Germany invades Denmark and Norway
- May 10: Germany invades France and the low countries
  - May 26: British troops evacuate Dunkirk
- June 10: Italy declares war on United Kingdom and France
- July 10: Germany begins an air campaign against Britain
  - September 7: Germany begins a major bombing campaign against Britain

=== 1941 ===
- June 22: Germany invades the Soviet Union
- September 8: The Siege of Leningrad begins
- October 2: The Battle of Moscow begins
- December 7: Japan attacks Pearl Harbor, bringing the United States into the war (Note: The United States Congress did not officially declare war until the next day)

=== 1942 ===
- February 8: Fall of Singapore
- May 4: Battle of the Coral Sea
- June 4: Battle of Midway
- July 1: First Battle of El Alamein
- July 17: Battle of Stalingrad
- August 19: Dieppe Raid
- October 23: Second Battle of El Alamein
- November 8: Operation Torch

=== 1943 ===
- July 4: Battle of Kursk
- July 9: Allied invasion of Sicily
- September 3: Allied invasion of Italy and surrender of Italy (Note: Signed on September 3, declared on September 8)

=== 1944 ===
- January 17: Battle of Monte Cassino
- January 22: Landings at Anzio
- April 19: Operation Ichi-Go
- June 6: D-Day
- June 22: Destruction of Army Group Center
- August 1: Warsaw Uprising
- August 15: Invasion of Southern France
- September 17: Operation Market Garden
- September 19: Battle of Hürtgen Forest
- October 23: Battle of Leyte Gulf
- December 16: Battle of the Bulge

=== 1945 ===
- April 16 - May 2: Battle of Berlin
- May 8: Victory in Europe Day
- August 6 and 9: Atomic bombings of Hiroshima and Nagasaki
- August 15: Victory over Japan Day
- September 2: Surrender of Japan

== World War II by region ==
=== Theatres and major campaigns ===
==== Europe ====
- Eastern front
- Western front
- Mediterranean and Middle Eastern theatre
  - Italian Campaign
- Arctic theatre
  - Arctic convoys

==== Asia ====
- Second Sino-Japanese War (Note: Undeclared from 1937 to 1941, this war merged into World War II in 1941)
- South-East Asian Theatre
- Pacific Ocean theatre

==== Africa ====
For all theatres in Africa, see: African theatres

- North African campaign
- West Africa campaign
- East African campaign

==== Other ====
- Home front during World War II

=== Europe ===
- Albania
  - Albania under Italy
- Belarus
- Bulgaria
  - Bulgarian resistance movement during World War II
- Carpathian Ruthenia
- Estonia
  - Occupation of Estonia by Nazi Germany
- Finland
- France
- Germany
- Gibraltar
- Greece
  - Axis occupation of Greece during World War II
- Hungary
- Ireland
- Italy
  - Italian Campaign
    - Allied invasion of Sicily
    - Allied invasion of Italy
- Latvia
  - Occupation of Latvia by Nazi Germany
- Leningrad Oblast
- Netherlands
- Soviet Union
- Spain
- United Kingdom
- Yugoslavia
  - Invasion of Yugoslavia
- Occupation of Baltic republics by Nazi Germany
- Occupation of Belarus by Nazi Germany
- Occupation of Denmark
- German occupation of the Channel Islands
- History of Poland (1939–1945)
  - Occupation of Poland (1939–1945)
  - Administrative division of Polish territories during World War II
  - War crimes in occupied Poland during World War II
  - Polish culture during World War II
- Romania

=== Asia ===
- Burma
- India
- Nepal
- Philippines
- Vietnam

=== Africa ===
- Algeria
- Egypt
- South Africa
- Southern Rhodesia

=== Oceania ===
- Australia
- New Zealand
  - Axis naval activity in New Zealand waters

=== The Americas ===
- United States
- Canada
- Greenland

== War crimes ==
The Second World War was characterized by many instances of War crimes:

=== Genocide ===
==== The Holocaust ====
- Nazism
- Nazi Party
- Nazi eugenics
- Political views of Adolf Hitler
- Anti-Jewish legislation in prewar Nazi Germany
- Diary of Anne Frank
- Nazi book burnings
- Nazi ghettos
- Nazi concentration camps
- Nazi extermination camps
  - Auschwitz
  - Belzec
  - Chełmno
  - Majdanek
  - Sobibor
  - Treblinka
- History of Jews in Europe
- History of the Jews during World War II
- List of major perpetrators of the Holocaust
- Nazi human experimentation
- Racial policy of Nazi Germany
- Persecution of homosexuals in Nazi Germany and the Holocaust
- List of individuals and groups assisting Jews during the Holocaust

==== Other genocides ====
- Nazi genocide of ethnic Poles
- Romani genocide

=== Massacres ===
- Three Alls Policy
- Nanjing massacre
- Massacres during the Warsaw Uprising
  - Wola massacre
  - Ochota massacre
- Katyn massacre

=== Mistreatment of civilians ===
- Comfort women
- Unit 731
- Rape during the occupation of Germany
- Population transfer in the Soviet Union

== Technology during World War II ==
Technology during World War II

- German military technology during World War II
- Allied technological cooperation during World War II
- Technological escalation during World War II

=== Equipment of World War II ===
- Lists of World War II military equipment
- Equipment losses in World War II

==== Vehicles of World War II ====
- List of World War II military vehicles by country
- List of World War II military vehicles of Germany
- List of World War II ship classes
- List of World War II ships
- List of World War II ships of less than 1000 tons
- List of WW2 Luftwaffe aircraft by manufacturer
- List of aircraft of Italy, World War II
- List of aircraft of Japan, World War II
- List of ships of the Imperial Japanese Navy
- List of aircraft of Russia, World War II
- List of aircraft of World War II
- List of aircraft of the French Air Force during World War II
- List of aircraft of the British, World War II
- List of aircraft of the Luftwaffe, World War II
- List of aircraft of the U.S. military, World War II
- List of armored fighting vehicles of World War II
- List of broadsides of major World War II ships
- List of undersea-carried planes during World War II
- List of weapons on Japanese combat aircraft
- List of prototype WWII combat vehicles
- List of foreign vehicles used by Nazi Germany in World War II
- List of helicopters used in World War II
- List of jet aircraft of World War II

==== Weapons of World War II ====
- List of World War II weapons
- List of World War II infantry weapons
- List of World War II firearms of Germany

== Other initiatives in World War II ==
- Nazi plunder

=== Propaganda during World War II ===
- Black propaganda
- World War II political cartoons
- List of Allied propaganda films of World War II
- American propaganda during World War II
  - Walt Disney's World War II propaganda production
- British propaganda during World War II
- Propaganda and India in World War II
- Soviet propaganda during World War II
- Nazi propaganda
- Propaganda in Fascist Italy
- Propaganda in Japan during the Second Sino-Japanese War and World War II

== Common military awards ==
=== Soviet Union ===
- Hero of the Soviet Union
- Order of Lenin
- Order of Suvorov
- Order of the October Revolution
- Order of the Red Banner
- Order of Victory

=== United States ===
- Medal of Honor
- Purple Heart
- Silver Star
- Bronze Star
- Distinguished Flying Cross
- Air Medal
- World War II Victory Medal
- Asiatic-Pacific Campaign Medal
- European-African-Middle Eastern Campaign Medal
- American Campaign Medal

=== United Kingdom ===
- Victoria Cross
- Air Force Cross
- Order of the Bath
- Order of the British Empire
- Distinguished Flying Cross
- Africa Star
- Pacific Star

=== France and Belgium ===
- Croix de Guerre

=== Poland ===
- Cross of the Valorous
- Order of Polonia Restituta
- Virtuti Militari

=== Nazi Germany ===
- Orders, decorations, and medals of Nazi Germany
- Iron Cross

== Aftermath of World War II ==
=== The end of World War II ===
- End of World War II in Europe
- End of World War II in the Pacific

== Immediate events ==
- War reparations
  - Japanese reparations
  - Forced labor of Germans in the Soviet Union
- Nuremberg trials
- International Military Tribunal for the Far East

=== The post-war world ===
- Cold War
  - Emergence of United States and USSR as global superpowers
  - NATO
  - Warsaw Pact
  - Iron Curtain
  - Proxy wars
  - Decolonization
- Post–World War II baby boom
- Pursuit of Nazi collaborators

== World War II - related media ==
- World War II in popular culture
- The Holocaust in popular culture
- List of World War II films
- History books about World War II

== See also ==
- Lists of World War II topics
- Names of World War II
- Opposition to World War II
- Outline of war
- Outline of World War I

== Bibliography ==
- Bix, Herbert P. (September 4, 2001). Hirohito and the making of modern Japan. HarperCollins. ISBN 978-0-06-093130-8.
