= Marne Medal =

Marne Medal Médaille de la Marne
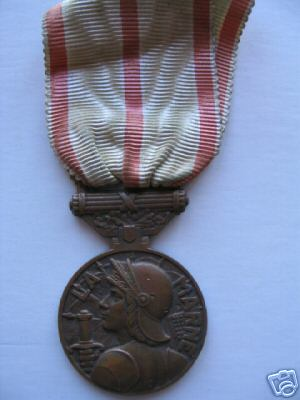
- Obverse of the medal
- Presented by: France
- Status: No longer awarded

The Marne Medal (French - médaille de la Marne) was a French medal awarded to soldiers who had fought in the First Battle of the Marne, the Second Battle of the Marne or both engagements, particularly those who took part in fighting between 6 and 12 September 1914 on the Senlis front at Verdun.

It was inaugurated on 21 August 1937 by the Les Soldats de la Marne association, later succeeded by the Mondement 1914 association.

It was presented to Charles de Gaulle by the association's president, commander Paul Gauvin at Esternay, with the radio journalist Jean-Pierre Elkabbach also present.

== Insignia ==
The medal was a 27mm diameter bronze disc, with an obverse showing a helmeted head, a sword handle and the inscription "LA MARNE" and a reverse inscribed "SOLDAT DE LA MARNE" (soldier of the Marne) in large characters in the centre, "1914" at the top and "1918" at the bottom, all surrounded by a laurel wreath. The ribbon was green with three vertical red stripes edged in white.

== See also ==
- Ribbons of the French military and civil awards
- Orient campaign medal: WWI French campaign medal for the Macedonian front
- Dardanelles campaign medal: WWI French campaign medal for the Gallipoli campaign
- 1914–1918 Inter-Allied Victory medal: WWI French victory medal
