= Walter von Gerich =

- Born: 30 August 1881; Helsinki, Finland
- Died: 1 September 1939 (aged 58); Helsinki, Finland

Walter von Gerich (30 August 1881 – 1 September 1939) was a Finnish civil servant and later an agent in German pay during World War I.

In 1917, he posed as a German baron and diplomatic courier under the name of "Walter von Rautenfels". He was arrested for espionage in Norway and for plotting to commit sabotage for Germany. He had several suitcases marked as diplomatic luggage which actually contained explosive devices. The stock of explosives included more than a hundred bombs, a hundred firebombs, detonators, and other supporting equipment.

Gerich was arrested in Kristiania on 16 June 1917. The police investigation was led by Johan Søhr, chief of the Kristiania Special Branch. During police interrogations Gerich admitted that his real name was Walter Harald von Gerich, Finnish military officer and later civil servant. He claimed that after fleeing to Germany in 1916 he was allowed to change his name to von Rautenfels, a name that previously had occurred in his family.

After some diplomatic pressure from Germany he was set free and escorted by the police to Germany on 27 June 1917. Several other involved persons were eventually sentenced to imprisonment. William Person was sentenced to six years prison, Wäino Pesonen to two years, Hjalmar Wirtanen 1½ years, Johannes Sandvik to 4½ years, and Allan Sandstrøm also 4½ years.

== Personal life ==
Gerich was born in Helsinki on 30 August 1881, a son of Karl Edvard Teodor von Gerich and Julia Olympia von Koeppen. In 1917 he married Elsa Matilda Jungstedt. He died in Helsinki on 1 September 1939.
