= Orient campaign medal =

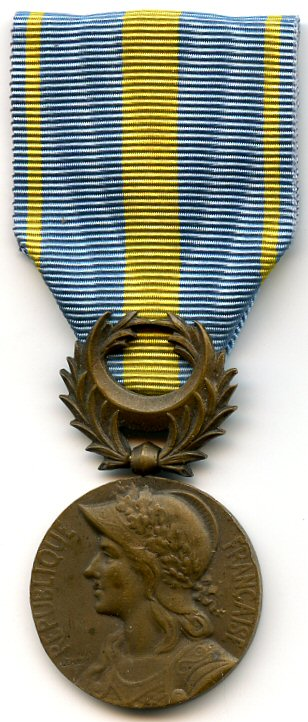
- Orient campaign medal (obverse)
- Type: Campaign medal
- Awarded for: Service with the French Army of the Orient prior to 11 November 1918
- Presented by: France
- Eligibility: French nationals and foreign nationals
- Status: No longer awarded
- Established: 15 June 1926
- Ribbon of the Orient campaign medal

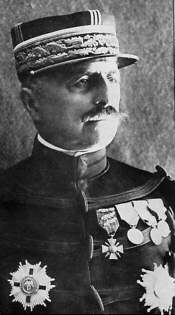
Louis Franchet D'Esperey, a recipient of the Orient campaign medal

The Orient campaign medal (French: "Médaille commémorative d'Orient") was a French military medal bestowed for participation in the battles against the Central Powers by the Allied Eastern Army between 1915 and 1918.

These battles culminated in the 1918 successful offensive under French general Louis Franchet d'Espèrey in Macedonia knocking Bulgaria out of the war and the overrunning of much of the Balkans.

== Award history ==
First proposed as a new clasp on the Colonial Medal, and then as a distinct medal in June 1917, it is finally and only on 15 June 1926 that this award will be officially established. The creation of the "1914-1918 war commemorative medal" (French: Médaille commémorative de la guerre 1914–1918) in 1920 and of the 1914-1918 "Interallied Victory Medal" (French: Médaille Interalliée de la Victoire 1914–1918) in 1922 will have placed enough pressure on the French Government to concede, even against the will of its defence minister, the need for official recognition of service in this theatre of operations.

The new medal is officially called the "Orient and Dardanelles' campaign medal" (French: "Médaille Commémorative d'Orient et des Dardanelles"), the intent being for a single medal for both campaigns albeit with different ribbons, but it is actually produced with different reverse inscriptions for the two fronts "ORIENT" or "DARDANELLES" and will only bear the "ORIENT" designation when bestowed for that front.

== Award statute ==
The Orient campaign medal is awarded to military and civilian personnel embarked prior to 11 November 1918 for service with the French Army of the Orient; to French personnel having served in the headquarters staff of the commandant of the Allied Eastern Army; to French sailors having served East of the 21st degree of longitude in operations related to those of the Allied Eastern Army.

No minimum time of service is mentioned in the award statute.

== Award description ==
The Orient campaign medal is a 30mm in diameter circular medal struck from bronze. The obverse bears the relief image of the "warrior republic" in the form of the left profile of a helmeted woman's bust, the helmet being adorned by a crown of oak leaves. On either side, the relief inscription along the circumference "FRENCH REPUBLIC" (French: RÉPUBLIQUE FRANÇAISE).

The reverse, representing both the army and navy, bears the relief image of an infantry rifle crossed with a naval anchor below two military banners and lances surmounted by the relief inscription "ORIENT". On some variants, the relief inscription "HONNEUR ET PATRIE 1915 1918" (HONOUR AND COUNTRY 1915 1918) can be found on one of the banners, other variants lack the anchor.

The medal hangs from a ribbon through a ring passing through the medal's suspension loop. The ring is adorned by a 24mm in diameter bronze laurel wreath and half crescent. The ribbon is 37mm wide and is light blue with a yellow central 7mm wide and 2mm wide stripes 2mm from the edges.

== Notable recipients (partial list) ==
- Maréchal de France Louis Franchet d'Espèrey
- Commandant Georges Cartier

== See also ==
- Ribbons of the French military and civil awards
- Marne Medal: WWI French campaign medal for the First and Second Battles of the Marne
- Dardanelles campaign medal: WWI French campaign medal for the Gallipoli campaign
- 1914–1918 Inter-Allied Victory medal: WWI French victory medal

== Sources ==
- http://www.france-phaleristique.com/accueil.htm
