= Dardanelles campaign medal =

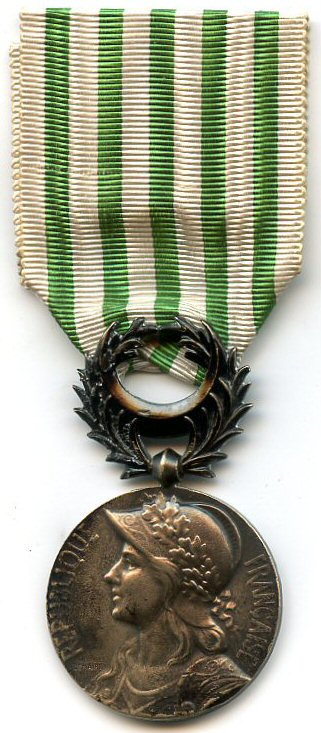
- Dardanelles campaign medal (obverse)
- Type: Campaign medal
- Awarded for: Service with the French Dardanelles Expeditionary Corps prior to 9 January 1916
- Presented by: France
- Eligibility: French nationals and foreign nationals
- Status: No longer awarded
- Established: 15 June 1926
- Ribbon of the Dardanelles campaign medal

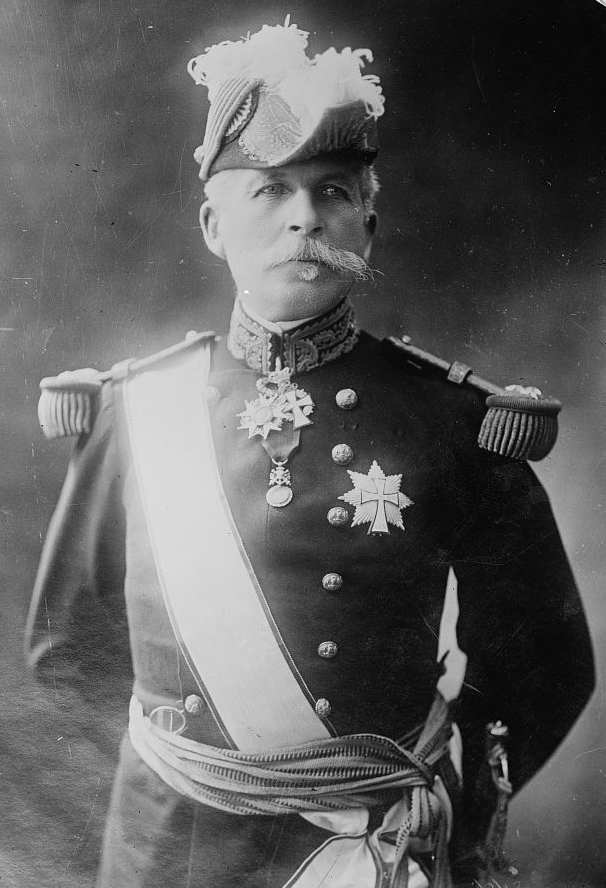
General Albert d'Amade, a recipient of the Dardanelles campaign medal

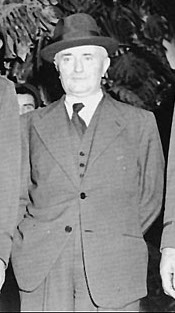
Admiral of the Fleet François Darlan, a recipient of the Dardanelles campaign medal

The Dardanelles campaign medal (French: "Médaille commémorative des Dardanelles") was a French military medal bestowed for participation in the Battle of the Dardanelles, also known as the Gallipoli campaign against the Central Powers by the Corps expéditionnaire d'Orient supported by the Royal Navy and French Navy between 25 April 1915 and 9 January 1916.

== Award history ==
First proposed as a new clasp on the Colonial Medal, and then as a distinct medal in June 1917, it is finally and only on 15 June 1926 that this award will be officially established. The creation of the "1914-1918 war commemorative medal" (French: Médaille commémorative de la guerre 1914–1918) in 1920 and of the 1914-1918 "Interallied Victory Medal" (French: Médaille Interalliée de la Victoire 1914–1918) in 1922 will have placed enough pressure on the French Government to concede, even against the will of its defence minister, the need for official recognition of service in this theatre of operations.

The new medal is officially called the "Orient and Dardanelles campaign medal" (French: "Médaille Commémorative d'Orient et des Dardanelles"), the intent being for a single medal for both campaigns albeit with different ribbons, but it is actually produced with different reverse inscriptions for the two fronts "ORIENT" or "DARDANELLES" and will only bear the "DARDANELLES" designation when bestowed for that front.

== Award statute ==
The Dardanelles campaign medal is awarded to military and civilian personnel embarked prior to 9 January 1916 for service with the French Dardanelles Expeditionary Corps; to French personnel having served in the headquarters staff of the commandant of the Allied Eastern Army; to French sailors having participated in the Dardanelles Expedition.

No minimum time of service is mentioned in the award statute.

== Award description ==
The Dardanelles campaign medal is a 30mm in diameter circular medal struck from bronze. The obverse bears the relief image of the "warrior republic" in the form of the left profile of a helmeted woman's bust, the helmet being adorned by a crown of oak leaves. On either side, the relief inscription along the circumference "FRENCH REPUBLIC" (French: RÉPUBLIQUE FRANÇAISE).

The reverse, representing both the army and navy, bears the relief image of an infantry rifle crossed with a naval anchor below two military banners and lances surmounted by the relief inscription "DARDANELLES". On some variants, the relief inscription "HONNEUR ET PATRIE 1915 1918" (HONOUR AND COUNTRY 1915 1918) can be found on one of the banners, other variants lack the anchor.

The medal hangs from a ribbon through a ring passing through the medal's suspension loop. The ring is adorned by a 24mm in diameter bronze laurel wreath and half crescent. The silk moiré ribbon is 37mm wide and is white with four equidistant 3mm wide green stripes beginning 3mm from the edges.

A gilt clasp with oriental ornamentation bearing the inscription "DARDANELLES" is sometimes worn on the ribbon, it is a privately purchased item and completely unofficial.

== Notable recipients (partial list) ==
- General Henri Gouraud
- General Albert d'Amade
- Admiral Charles Perzo
- Master gunner Louis Blasi
- Lieutenant Gabriel de Champeaux de La Boulaye
- Doctor Jean Clunet
- Admiral of the Fleet François Darlan
- Lieutenant Jean Giraudoux

== See also ==
- Ribbons of the French military and civil awards
- Orient campaign medal: WWI French campaign medal for the Macedonian front
- Marne Medal: WWI French campaign medal for the First and Second Battles of the Marne
- 1914–1918 Inter-Allied Victory medal: WWI French victory medal

== Sources ==
- http://www.france-phaleristique.com/accueil.htm
