= Espionage in Norway during World War I =

Norway was a neutral country during World War I, but the country was subject to extensive espionage from both sides in the conflict.

== Background ==
Two proactive Acts had been sanctioned by the Norwegian Parliament in the early phase of the conflict. These were Lov om forsvarshemmeligheter in 1914, and Lov om kontroll av post- og telegrafforbindelser in 1915. Chief of the criminal department of the Kristiania Police Johan Søhr was responsible for police investigations of espionage in Norway during World War I. In 1938 he wrote a book giving an account of the espionage investigations during the war period.

== Cases ==
=== Finnmark ===
The county of Finnmark borders to both Finland and Russia, and during the Finnish Civil War and the Russian Civil War considerable amounts of goods were transported from the village of Skibotn into Finland, and from the village of Karasjok into Russia. Among the famous incidents of espionage was the arrest and expulsion of the Swedish Baron Otto von Rosen, who operated in Northern Norway as a German agent. He was arrested in Karasjok in January 1917. Among the confiscations in this affair were cultures of anthrax bacteria and the toxin curare, and also explosives.

=== Oslo ===
A number of suspected spies operating in or near Kristiania were investigated. Among the best known cases was the Rautenfels affair, when the German diplomatic courier Walter von Rautenfels was accused of leading a sabotage league with the purpose of attacking Allied ships. After a long investigation 188 kg of explosives, in suitcases and packing cases, were confiscated at the railway station Oslo Ø. These included 95 larger and 12 smaller explosive bombs, 104 fire bombs, detonators and percussion caps. Due to diplomatic pressure Rautenfels was extradited to Germany because of his immunity as courier for the German Emperor, while other members of the league were eventually convicted and sent to prison.

=== Other cities ===
The cities of Bergen and Trondheim were subject to several espionage cases during World War I. Bergen was an important harbour, and information about ships traffic was sensitive due to the U-boat Campaign by the German Empire against Britain and her allies. From 1914 to 1918 more than 800 Norwegian merchant ships were sunk due to the German U-boat Campaign. A series of unexplained fires occurred in 1917, in Horten, Holmestrand, Stavanger, Sørengen, Trondheim and Orkdal, Greaker, Tveitsund, Hurum, Gjøvik, Skien and Tønsberg.
