= Montserrat in World War I =

Montserrat, a British Overseas Territory located in the Caribbean, played a minor role in the First World War. Much of their contribution was funding or materials gathered by civilians, although a small number of Montserratians served in the Army, or Marine Navy. Montserrat holds a Remembrance Day annually on 14 November, to remember Montserratians who died in World War I, alongside those who died in World War II and the Iraq War.

== History ==
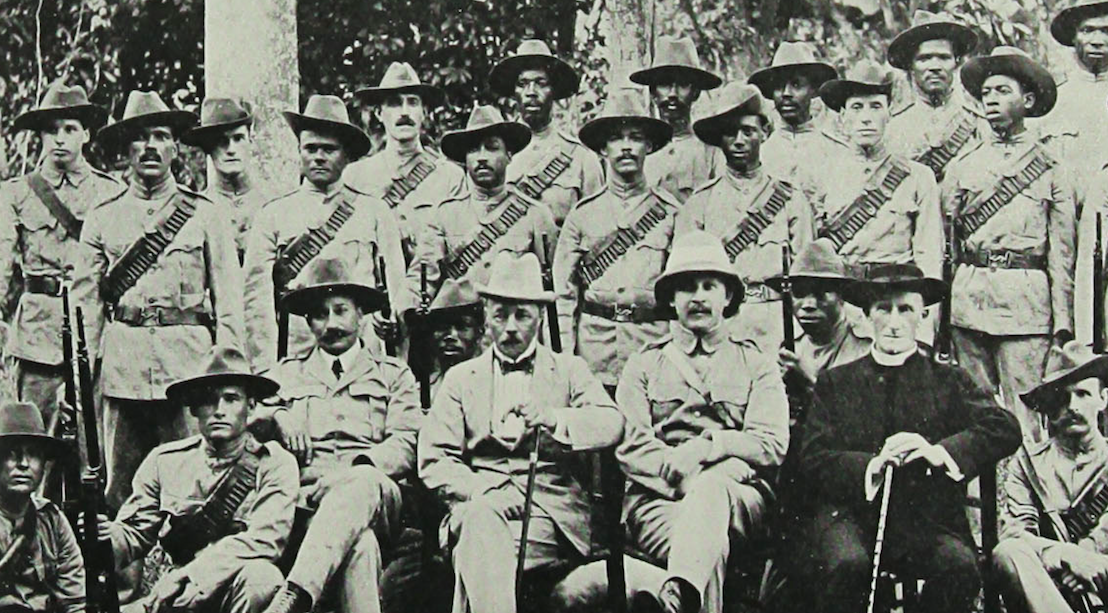
A picture of the Montserrat Defence Reserve in 1915.

After the German Empire invaded neutral Belgium as a part of the First World War, Great Britain declared war upon them on 4 August 1914. The entirety of the British Empire declared war upon them on the same day, including Montserrat, which was administered as part of the federal crown colony of the British Leeward Islands at the time. Almost immediately, a militia was formed, called the Montserrat Defence Reserve.

== Civilian effort ==
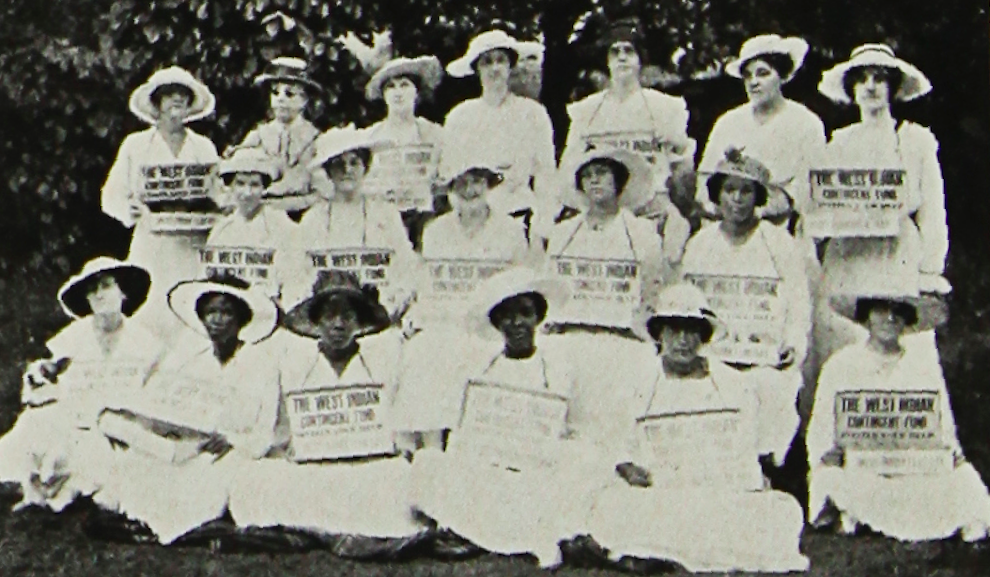
One such group, the Montserrat Flag Day ladies, in 1917

Many Local Ladies Committees were formed to raise funds and support for the war effort. They also organised drives for material donations, such as one in which 250 pounds (110 kg) of Guava Jelly was collected. Many of the individual presidencies of the five Leeward Islands donated money for the war effort. Montserrat was one, donating £1,000 (worth about £40,000 today) to the British Empire. A number of locals served in the Merchant Navy. Of these, six died in service.

== Legacy ==
Every 14 November, Montserrat holds a Remembrance Day, in which all Montserratians who died in the First World War are remembered, along with the Montserratians who died in the Second World War and the Iraq War. There was a war memorial in Plymouth, Montserrat, but it was abandoned when volcanic eruptions buried the town. In 2010 a new war memorial, in Little Bay, Montserrat, was christened. According to official records, the following Montserratians are recorded as having died due to the First World War: John Kingsley Martin, William Nugent Gordon, William Goather, Maurice Hannam, Burleigh Hannam, Adolphus Peters, and Arthur Samuel Warner.
