= Vietnam during World War I =

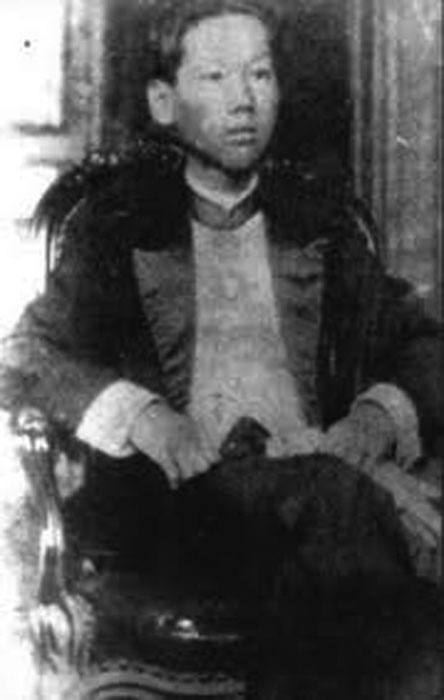
Emperor of Vietnam, Duy Tân in 1916, emperor at the outbreak of the "Great War". Taking advantage of France busying in the conflict, he attempted to join an anti-French rebellion in 1916 but was captured and deposed.

At the onset of World War I, Vietnam, nominally under the Nguyễn dynasty, was under French protectorate and part of French Indochina. While seeking to maximize the use of Indochina's natural resources and manpower to fight the war, France cracked down all Vietnamese patriotic movements. Many Vietnamese fought later in the conflict.

== World War I service ==
=== In Europe and the Middle East ===
The French entry into World War I saw the authorities in Vietnam press-gang thousands of "volunteers" for service in Europe, leading to uprisings in Tonkin and Cochinchina.

Almost 100,000 Vietnamese were conscripts and went to Europe to fight and serve on the French battlefront, or work as laborers. Several battalions fought and suffered loss of lives at the Somme and Picardy, while others were deployed at Verdun, the Chemin des Dames, and in Champagne. Vietnamese troops also served in the Balkans and the Middle East. Exposed to new political ideals and returning to a colonial occupation of their own country (by a ruler that many of them had fought and died for), resulted in some sour attitudes. Many of these troops sought out and joined the Vietnamese nationalist movement focused on overthrowing the French.

=== Vietnamese order of battle ===
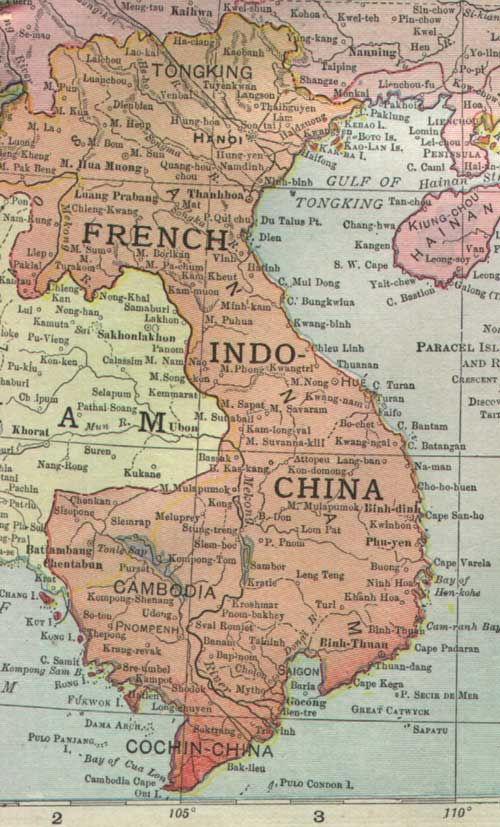
French Indochina in 1913

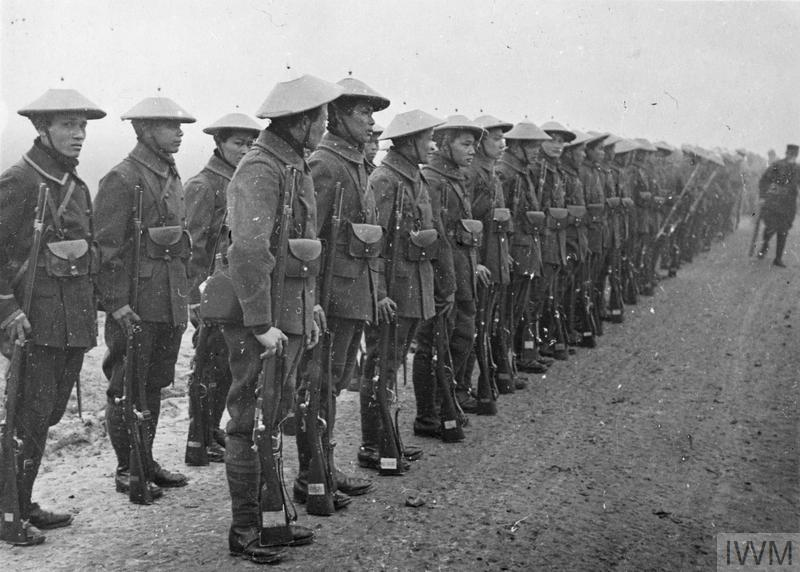
Company of Vietnamese troops parading for ceremonial investiture with decorations at Etampes in World War I

A total of 92,311 Vietnamese men from Indochina were in the service of France and were distributed in the following formations:

- 4,800 belonging to the 4 or 5 combat battalions
- 24,212 belonging to the 15 transit battalions
- 9,019 colonial medical staff
- 48,981 colonial laborers

Two battalions of Vietnamese combat soldiers served in France: the 7ème and the 21ème Bataillons de Marche Indochinois, RTIC.

The 7th Battalion was formed from the Vietnamese in Tonkin on February 16, 1916 and landed at Marseilles in September. They underwent training at Frejus until April 1917. On 10 April, the 7th was assigned to the 19th Division but on attachment to the 12th Division:

- 1 Cie- attached to the 54th Ri at Sept Monts
- 2 Cie – attached to the 67th RI at Ambrie
- 3 Cie – to the 350th RI at Sept Monts
- 5 Cie – to 12th Div depot at Rozic

The 4th Cie, the HQ and the Machinegun Company remained under the command of the regimental commander (Dez) at Montramboeuf.

They first saw action with the 12th ID during the 2nd Battle of the Aisne on the Chemin des Dames on the 5–7 May 1917 following up the attack of the regiments to which they were attached and were involved in resupplying the forward troops, consolidating trenches and in the organization of any captured territory.

In June 1918, the battalion was in the trenches in the area of Anould (Vosges), staying there until 22 June during which time they were involved in the repulse of a strong German attack. A short move to the trenches at Clové then followed where they were involved in two attacks between 29 and 30 October 1918. At the time of the armistice, they were stationed in Lorraine and left France at Marseilles on 15 February 1919, arriving at Haiphong where the unit was dissolved.

The 21st Battalion was formed, from Vietnamese soldiers already serving in France, on 1 December 1916 at Camp St. Raphael (Var), its strength being 21 officers, 241 Europeans and 1,200 Vietnamese. From April 5, 1917 the battalion was employed at Dand (Aisne) in road repair, care for airfields and drainage work on the battlefield. From late May to late July it was serving in the frontline trenches of the Vosges, moving in August to the area of Reims. It returned to the Vosges and it held the positions in the area of Montigny and was dissolved on April 18, 1919.

2 combat battalions also served in Salonika: the 1er and the 2ème.

Laborers from Indochina in France during the war period:

- during 1915 – 4,631
- during 1916 – 26,098
- during 1917 – 11,719
- during 1918 – 5,806
- during 1919 – 727

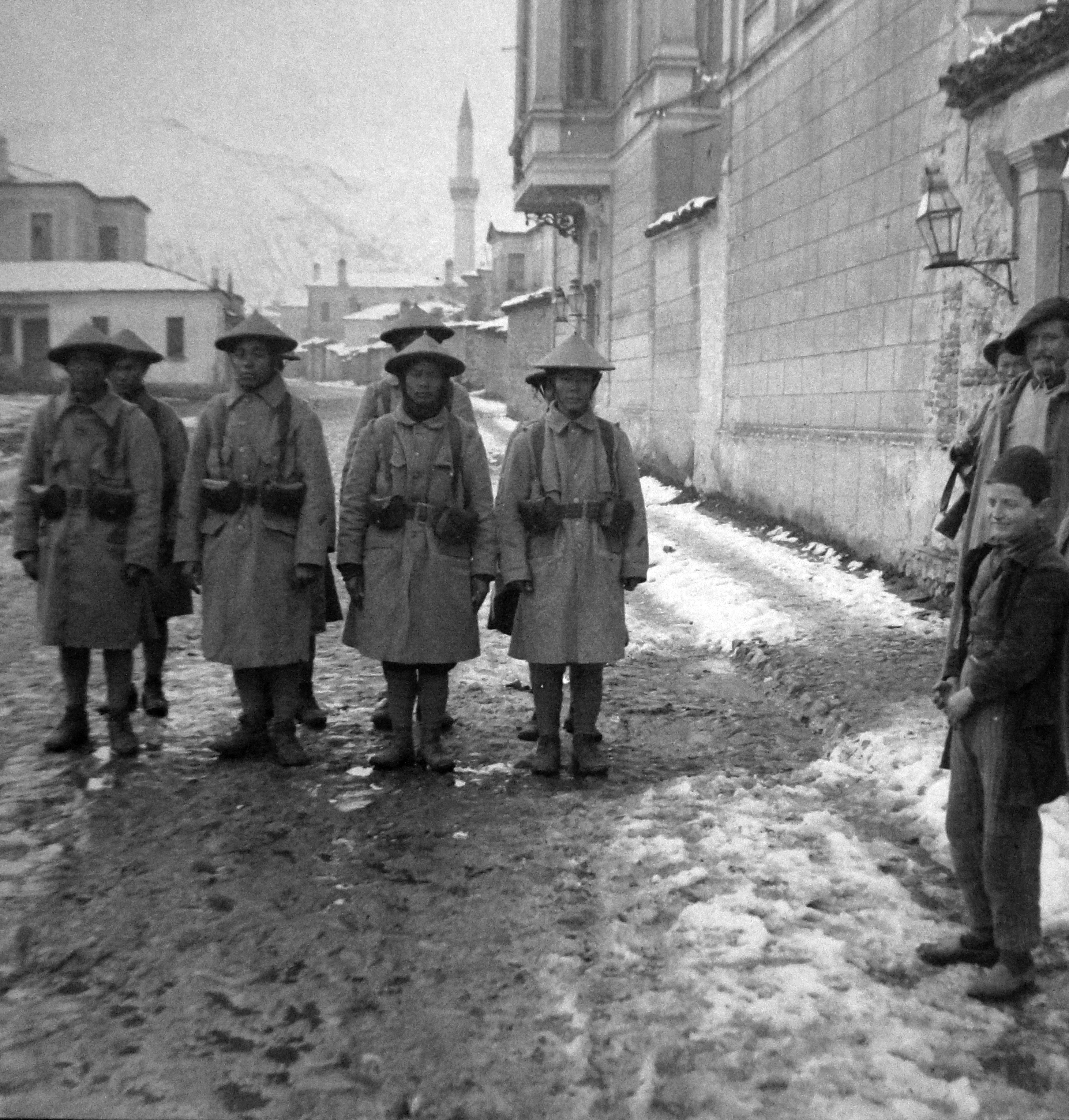
Tirailleurs of the 2ème battalion in Korçë, Albania, January 1917

On the outbreak of World War I many of the French officers and non-commissioned officers of the tirailleurs tonkinois and tirailleurs annamite were recalled to France. The Tonkinese riflemen of the 6e Battalion de Tirailleurs Indochine subsequently saw service on the Western Front near Verdun.

In 1915 a battalion of the 3rd Regiment of Tonkinese Rifles (3rd R.T.T.) was sent to China to garrison the French Concession in Shanghai. The tirailleurs remaining in Indochina saw service in 1917 in putting down a mutiny of the Garde Indignene (native gendarmerie) in Thai Nguyen. In August 1918 three companies of tirailleurs tonkinois formed part of a battalion of French Colonial Infantry sent to Siberia as part of the Allied intervention following the Russian Revolution.

=== Casualties ===
As the Vietnamese fought and died on the French side, their involvement and losses on the battlefields contributed significantly to Vietnam's national identity. In 2004, a Russian journalist published a handbook of human losses in the 20th century which included the Vietnamese military deaths during World War I - over 12,000 men died. The Vietnamese also endured additional heavy taxes to help pay for France's war efforts. There is a war memorial that commemorates the Vietnamese military losses at Saint-Pierre cemetery in Aix-en-Provence.

== Home front ==
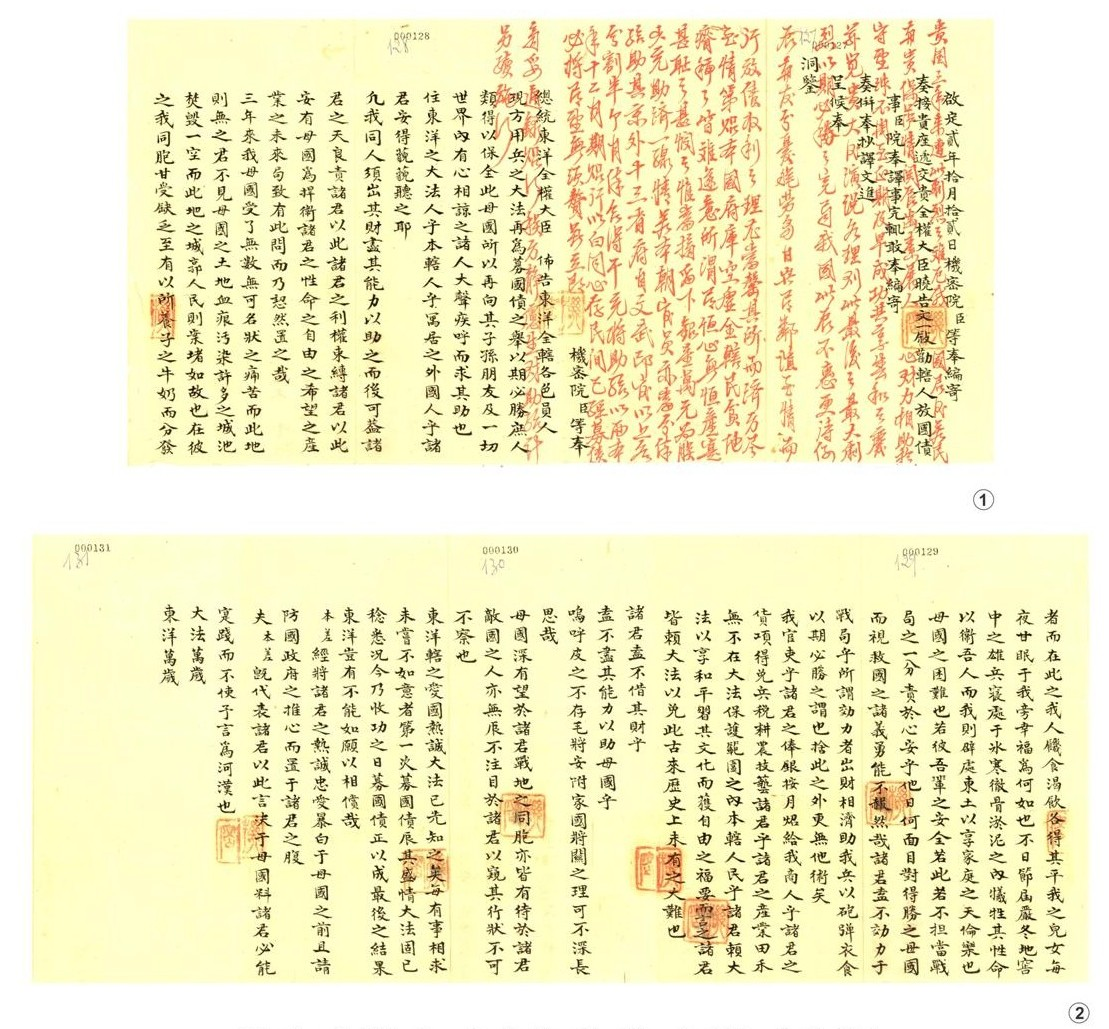
A report by the Viện cơ mật on the financial and military aid given by the Nguyễn dynasty to Great France in the year Khải Định 2 (1917). Note how the document ends with the phrases Đại Pháp vạn tuế, Đông Dương vạn tuế (大法萬歲, 東洋萬歲).

=== Initial changes ===
Through contacts with Europeans and their writings, some acquired a taste for current ideas of national autonomy, revolutionary struggle and the like. Vietnam also contributed 184 million piasters in the form of loans and 336,000 tons of food. These burdens proved all the heavier as agriculture was hard hit by natural disasters from 1914 to 1917.

Lacking a unified nationwide organization, the Vietnamese national movement, though still vigorous, failed to take advantage of the difficulties France was experiencing as a result of the war to stage any significant uprisings. The scholars' movement had declined while new social forces were not yet strong enough to promote large-scale campaigns.

=== Uprisings ===
Numerous anti-French revolts occurred in Vietnam during the war, all of which were easily suppressed by the French. In May 1916, the 16-year-old king, Duy Tân, escaped from his palace in order to take part in an uprising of Vietnamese troops organized by Thái Phiên and Trần Cao Vân. The French were informed of the plan and the leaders arrested and executed. Duy Tân was deposed and exiled to Réunion Island in the Indian Ocean.

One of the most effective uprisings during this period was in the northern Vietnamese province of Thái Nguyên. Some 300 Vietnamese soldiers revolted and released 200 political prisoners, whom, in addition to several hundred local people, they armed. The rebels held the town of Thái Nguyên for several days, hoping for help from Chinese nationalists. None arrived, however, and the French retook the town and hunted down most of the rebels.

It was also about this time that a young Hồ Chí Minh arrived in the United States, where he apparently stayed for a few years. There was no doubt that he did menial work to support himself, while learning and absorbing the American English language and culture. He acquired an affinity with the blacks in New York; Harlem in particular, and when he declared independence for Vietnam on September 2, 1945 in Hanoi, Hồ quoted verbatim the preamble of the American Declaration of Independence.

=== Patriotic publishing and secret societies ===
In 1917 the moderate reformist journalist Phạm Quỳnh had begun publishing the quốc ngữ journal Nam Phong in Hanoi. It addressed the problem of adopting modern Western values without destroying the cultural essence of the Vietnamese nation. By World War I, quốc ngữ had become the vehicle for the dissemination of not only Vietnamese, Hán, and French literary and philosophical classics but also a new body of Vietnamese nationalist literature emphasizing social comment and criticism.

In Cochinchina, patriotic activity manifested itself in the early years of the century by the creation of underground societies. The most important of which was the Thiên Địa Hội (Heaven and Earth Association) whose branches covered many provinces around Saigon. These associations often took the form of political-religious organizations, one of their main activities was to punish traitors in the pay of the French.

Connected to these secret societies, a movement led by a former bonze, Phan Xích Long, was organized in 1913. Its members, wearing white clothes and turbans, attacked the cities with primitive weapons. Phan Xich Long was eventually captured and executed by the French. In 1916, underground societies in Cochinchina tried to attack several administrative centers, including the central prison in Saigon and the residence of the local French governor. On the night of February 14, 1916, thousands of people armed with knives and wearing amulets infiltrated Saigon and fought French police and troops, who succeeded in defeating them.

The colonial administration, while harshly suppressing the national movement, sought to appease the elite by introducing a few paltry reforms, with promises of important postwar reforms from the more generous "liberal" governors. These promises were never fulfilled. The fact that France succeeded in holding on to Vietnam during the war years was mainly due to the weakness of the national movement. There were, of course, patriots to carry on the fight for national independence, but the new and still embryonic social forces failed to give the movement the necessary vigor and direction. Not until these forces had further developed over subsequent decades was the national movement able to be revitalized.

== Post-war ==
Following World War I, foreign investment in Vietnam mushroomed. As a result, coal mines in the North, rubber plantations in Central and South Vietnam, and the rapid increase of production for rice farmers in the south spawned a working class, as well as a landlord class, rice exporters in Saigon and a modern intelligentsia.

An important development in the early part of the 20th century was the increased use of quốc ngữ in the northern part of the country through a proliferation of new journals printed in that script. There had been quốc ngữ publications in Cochinchina since 1865, but in 1898 a decree of the colonial government prohibited publication without permission, in the protectorate areas, of periodicals in quốc ngữ or chữ nôm that were not published by a French citizen. In 1913 Nguyễn Văn Vĩnh succeeded in publishing Đông Dương Tạp Chí (Indochinese Review), a strongly antitraditional but pro-French journal. He also founded a publishing house that translated such Vietnamese classics as the early 19th century poem "The Tale of Kieu," as well as nôm classics into quốc ngữ. Nguyen Van Vinh's publications, while largely pro-Western, were the major impetus for the increasing popularity of quốc ngữ in Annam and Tonkin.

In the years immediately following World War I, the scholar- led Vietnamese independence movement in Cochinchina began a temporary decline as a result, in part, of tighter French control and increased activity by the French-educated Vietnamese elite. The decrease of both French investments in and imports to Vietnam during the war had opened opportunities to entrepreneurial Vietnamese, who began to be active in light industries such as rice milling, printing, and textile weaving. The sale of large tracts of land in the Mekong Delta by the colonial government to speculators at cheap prices resulted in the expansion of the Vietnamese landed aristocracy. These factors, combined, led to the rise of a wealthy Vietnamese elite in Cochinchina that was pro-French but was frustrated by its own lack of political power and status.

== Notable individuals ==
- Đỗ Hữu Vị (vi), recognized as the first Vietnamese who flew a fighter aircraft

== Bibliography ==
- Rives, Maurice. Les Linh Tap, page 34. ISBN 2-7025-0436-1
- Beck, Sanderson. South Asia, 1800–1950, World Peace Communications, 2008. ISBN 0979253233
- Xu, Guoqi. Asia and the Great War – A Shared History (Oxford UP, 2016) online
- Trân, Claire Thi Liên (2022). "Indochina". In Ute Daniel; Peter Gatrell; et al. (eds.). 1914–1918 Online: International Encyclopedia of the First World War. Freie Universität Berlin. doi:10.15463/ie1418.11594.
