= Sven Gerich =

German politician (born 1974)

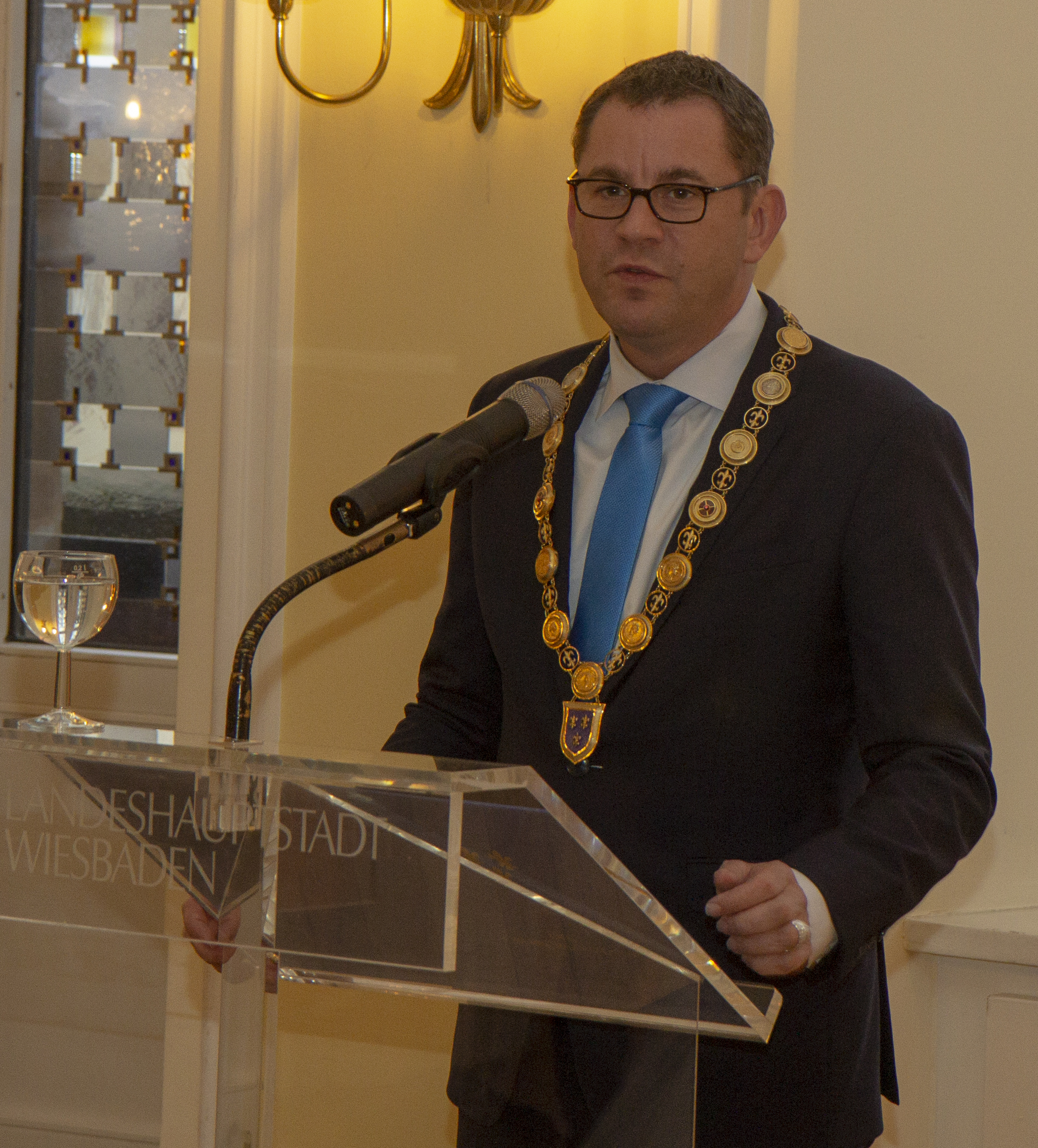

Mayor of Wiesbaden
- Incumbent
- Assumed office 1 July 2013
- Preceded by: Helmut Müller

Personal details
- Born: 30 October 1974 (age 51) Hannoversch Münden, West Germany
- Party: Social Democratic Party of Germany (SPD)
- Website: gerich-wiesbaden.de (German)

Sven Gerich (born 30 October 1974 in Hannoversch Münden) is a German politician from Social Democratic Party of Germany (SPD).

== Life ==
Gerich worked in his father's company in Wiesbaden. He has been mayor of Wiesbaden since 1 July 2013 . On 24 January 2019, he announced that he would not run again in the May 2019 election. Gerich is married to his partner Helge. In June 2020, the Munich District Court sentenced Gerich to a fine of 28,800 euros and ordered the forfeiture of bribes in the amount of 20,000 euros. Gerich was able to save his retirement benefits as a former OB because of the sentence, which did not lead to an indictment. The court also ordered the forfeiture of bribes.

== Other activities ==
- ESWE Versorgungs AG, Ex-Officio Chairman of the Supervisory Board
- Kraftwerke Mainz-Wiesbaden AG, Ex-Officio Chairman of the Supervisory Board
