= Haiti during World War I =

Following the United States declaration of war on Germany (1917), the Haitian government protested against the heavy German U-boat submarine activity in the area, and officially declared war on July 12, 1918.

== United States occupation of Haiti ==
The United States occupation of Haiti began on July 28, 1915, when 330 US Marines landed at the Haitian capital city of Port-au-Prince, on the authority of United States President Woodrow Wilson. The July Intervention took place after the murder of dictator President Vilbrun Guillaume Sam by insurgents angered by his political executions of his political opponents.

== Vilbrun Guillaume Sam ==
Vilbrun Guillaume Sam (March 4, 1859 - July 28, 1915) was President of Haiti from March 4 - July 27, 1915.

The culmination of the repressive measures came on July 27, 1915, as he was responsible for ordering the execution of 167 political prisoners, including former president Zamor, who was being held in a Port-au-Prince jail. This infuriated the population, which rose against the Sam government as soon as news of the executions reached them.

Sam fled to the French Embassy, where he received asylum. The Haitian rebels' mulatto leaders broke into the embassy and Sam was found. The rebels dragged him out, beating him senseless and throwing his limp body over the embassy's iron fence to the waiting populace, who ripped his body to pieces and paraded the parts through the capital's neighborhoods. In two weeks the country was in chaos.

== Philippe Sudré Dartiguenave ==
Philippe Sudré Dartiguenave (1862 - 1926) was a lawyer propelled to power in Haiti as the twenty-seventh President of the Republic of Haiti (1915–1922). He became the president after the Invasion of Haiti by the United States. Dartiguenave continued Haiti's participation in World War I alongside France and the United States in World War I. with the victory of the Triple Entente, Haiti was a victorious ally in 1918. The credit then returned to President Dartiguenave.

Following the United States' entry into World War I, the Haitian government protested against the heavy German submarine activity in the area. Haiti expelled all Germans from the country and the German Empire broke off diplomatic relations with Port-au-Prince on June 16, 1917.

== Entry into World War I ==
A month after the United States declared war, Haitian President Dartiguenave asked the Haitian Congress for a declaration of war because of the destruction by a German submarine of a French steamer which had among its crew and passengers Haitian citizens. Congress refused but a few days later adopted a resolution condemning unrestricted submarine warfare and empowering the president to break off diplomatic relations with Germany if that country refused reparations and guarantee for the future. Haiti eventually declared war in July 1918.
