= Laffaux =

- Commune
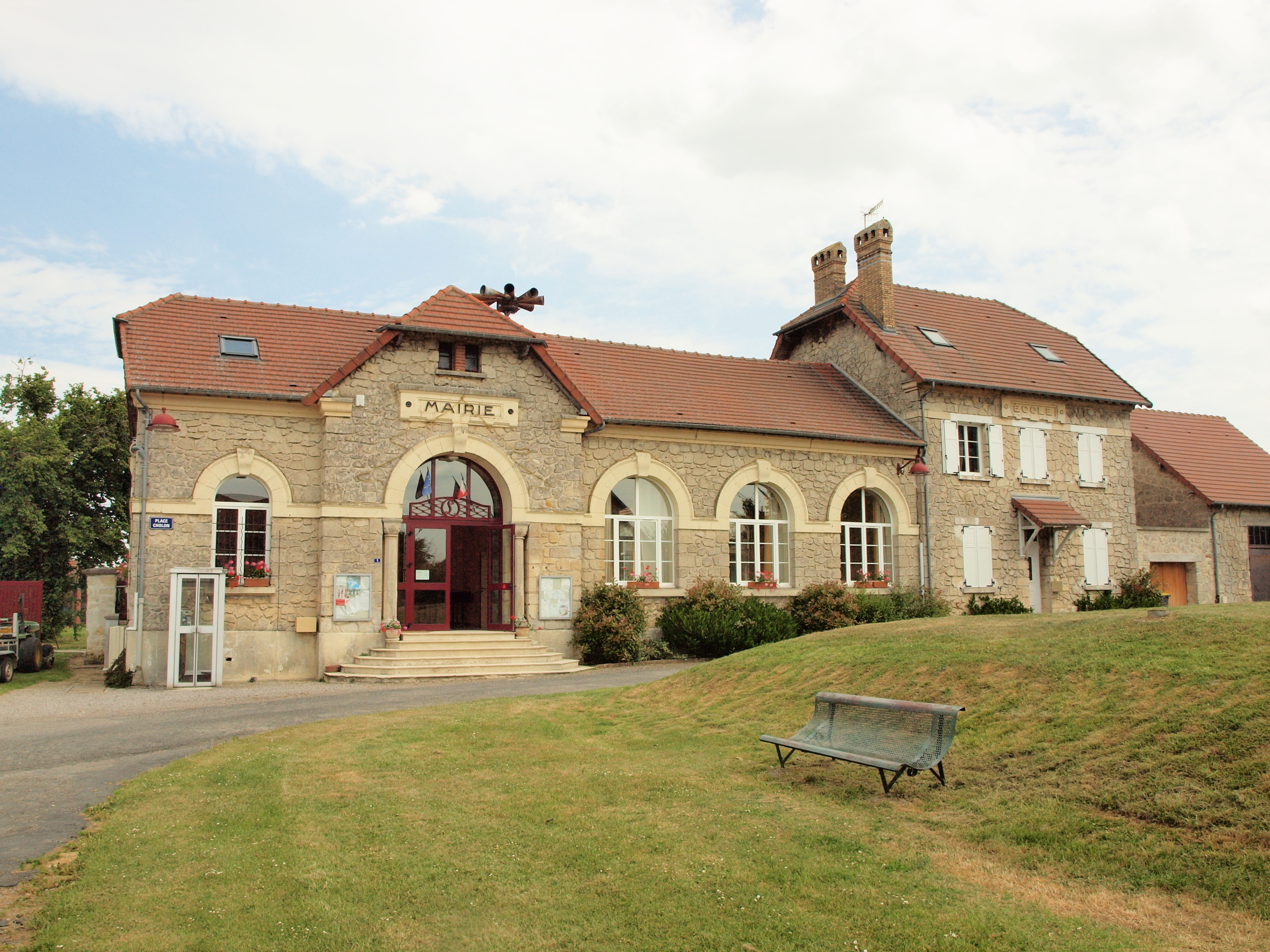
- The town hall and school of Laffaux
- Location of Laffaux
- Location within France Location within Hauts-de-France
- Coordinates: 49°26′57″N 3°25′34″E
- Country: France
- Region: Hauts-de-France
- Department: Aisne
- Arrondissement: Soissons
- Canton: Fère-en-Tardenois
- Intercommunality: Val de l'Aisne

Government
  - Mayor (2026–32): Christophe Goin
- Area^{1}: 6.76 km^{2} (2.61 sq mi)
- Elevation: 156 m (512 ft)
- Highest elevation: 172 m (564 ft)
- Lowest elevation: 79 m (259 ft)
- Population (2023): 149
  - Density: 22.0/km^{2} (57.1/sq mi)
- Time zone: UTC+01:00 (CET)
  - Summer (DST): UTC+02:00 (CEST)
- INSEE/Postal code: 02400 /02880
- ^{1} French Land Register data, which excludes lakes, ponds, glaciers > 1 km^{2} (0.386 sq mi or 247 acres) and river estuaries.

Laffaux (French pronunciation: [lafo]) is a commune in the Aisne department in Hauts-de-France in northern France.

== Population ==
Historical population
Year	Pop.	±% p.a.
1968	139	—
1975	148	+0.90%
1982	130	−1.84%
1990	144	+1.29%
1999	145	+0.08%
2007	131	−1.26%
2012	148	+2.47%
2017	149	+0.13%
2023	149	+0.00%
Source: INSEE

== See also ==
- Communes of the Aisne department
