= Otto von Rosen =

Swedish sports shooter

Personal information
- Born: Otto Carl Robert von Rosen; 11 May 1884 Stockholm, Sweden
- Died: 26 May 1963 (aged 79) Halmstad, Sweden

Sport
- Sport: Sports shooting

Otto Carl Robert von Rosen (11 May 1884 – 26 May 1963) was a Swedish military officer and sport shooter who participated in sabotage attacks during the First World War.

== Biography ==
Baron Von Rosen was born in Solna, Sweden. He is reported to have been a charismatic individual who served as a lieutenant in the Swedish army. He represented his country in various shooting competitions and participated at the 1908 Summer Olympics in London. His best Olympic result was in the moving target small-bore rifle, where he placed 8th. In 1912, von Rosen moved to Finland, which, as a Grand Duchy, then formed part of the Russian Empire. Here, at the outbreak of the First World War, he became embroiled in the movement for Finnish independence.

In 1916, under the cover of his own trading company, covert links were established by von Rosen to the German General Staff. The latter provided him and his associates with explosives and sugar cubes containing tiny glass ampoules holding Bacillus anthracis (the causative agent of anthrax) spores in a liquid medium. These were shipped across the border to northern Finland where von Rosen and his guerrilla squad infiltrated remote Russian army garrisons and deposited the adulterated sugar cubes into feed troughs of horses and cattle. Entries in von Rosen's diary refer to the supply of anthrax cultures to rebels throughout northern Finland. In the winter of 1917, von Rosen was arrested in Karasjok Municipality in Finnmark, Norway. In his confiscated luggage were found maps of Russia and Finland, explosives, bottles with the toxin curare, and anthrax bacteria hidden in sugar lumps. Twenty-one days after his arrest, von Rosen was deported to Sweden.

Two of von Rosen's sugar lumps went unnoticed when they were displayed for approximately eight decades in a police museum in Trondheim, Norway. In 1997, after their rediscovery, they were sent to the Defence Evaluation Research Agency, Chemical and Biological Defence, in Porton Down, United Kingdom. Scientists here were able to confirm that the capillary tubes did contain DNA from B. anthracis.
