= List of strikes in Egypt =

Throughout Egyptian history, a number of strikes, labour disputes, student strikes, hunger strikes, and other industrial actions have occurred.

== Background ==
A labour strike is a work stoppage caused by the mass refusal of employees to work. This can include wildcat strikes, which are done without union authorisation, and slowdown strikes, where workers reduce their productivity while still carrying out minimal working duties. It is usually a response to employee grievances, such as low pay or poor working conditions. Strikes can also occur to demonstrate solidarity with workers in other workplaces or pressure governments to change policies.

== Ancient Egypt ==
- Deir el-Medina strikes

== 20th century ==
=== 1900s ===
- 1906–07 Egyptian taxi protests, including strikes, by taxi drivers.

=== 1910s ===
- Egyptian Labour Corps mutinies
- 1919 Egyptian revolution

=== 1930s ===
- 1935–1936 protests in Egypt

=== 1940s ===
- 1946 Cairo general strike, general strike in the Kingdom of Egypt after several students were killed protesting against British occupation.
- 1948 Egyptian police strike

=== 1950s ===
- 1951 Egyptian doctors' strike
- 1952 Egyptian revolution

=== 1960s ===
- 1968 protests in Egypt

=== 1970s ===
- 1972 Egyptian student protests
- 1977 Egyptian bread riots

=== 1980s ===
- 1989 Helwan strike, strike by steelworkers in Helwan, Egypt.

=== 1990s ===
- 1994 Egyptian lawyers' strike

== 21st century ==
=== 2000s ===
- 2006–07 Egyptian textile strikes, series of strikes at the Misr Spinning and Weaving Company.
- 2008 Egyptian general strike

=== 2010s ===
- 2011 Egyptian revolution
- 2012–2013 Egyptian protests

== See also ==
- Trade unions in Egypt
- Human rights in Egypt
