= 2000 uprising in Egypt =

The 2000 uprising in Egypt was a massive surge of protests that began in solidarity with the second intifada in Palestine. Tens of thousands of Egyptians joined street demonstrations which also were directed at Arab governments, including Egyptian president Mubarak’s, for their inaction and perceived failure to support the Palestinian cause. The protests that initially focused on the Palestinian cause quickly evolved into broader protests against the regime itself, driven by demands for democratic reform, frustration over economic hardship, widespread corruption, and growing opposition to the ruling government.

== Solidarity with Palestine ==
The initial uprising was against the use of force against peaceful demonstrators in Palestine, a part of the Second Intifada. Massive protests erupted in solidarity with the Palestinian protesters, demanding democratic reforms and an end to killings of demonstrators in Palestine and Gaza Strip. Pro-Palestine protests became a symbol of civil disobedience and disorder movements in Tahrir Square, where protests first took place. Mass protests then swept the Middle East, inspired by the popular anti-Israeli sentiment in Egypt.

== Government response ==
After two weeks of protests in Egypt, president Hosni Mubarak ordered a crackdown on protesters and banned the burning of flags, due to the burning of the United States of America's flag and Israel's flag. A protester described how the renewed wave of street activism was met with harsh repression, as police forces broke up the demonstrations and carried out widespread arrests of student leaders.

Chants was also voiced at national protests and demonstrations in Cairo against war and demanded peace and full independence of Palestine. One of the most famous slogans was ‘أسفل إسرائيل’, meaning ‘Down, Down Israel’. Anti-Hosni Mubarak protests swept Port Said and Suez, led by mostly students. Massive general strikes and labour protests have been also sweeping Egypt, while increasingly violent demonstrations and growing street opposition snowballed into further escalation. The Military and Tanks was deployed to disperse demonstrators while protests escalated and drew more and more groups to join the movement, calling on reforms, an end to corruption, Hosni Mubarak to resign and demand full independence of Palestine yet the annexation and defeat of Israel. Protesters used civil disobedience, peaceful movements, bloodless disturbances and nonviolent boycotts by schoolchildren, students, refugees and teachers in downtown areas nationwide. Mass protests continued, and protesters were adamant to oust the government and close the borders with Israel and see better living conditions, but however, the amount of police brutality left many shocked and outraged. Protesters also wanted political reforms, police reforms and justice and accountability over the killings of protesters in the Second Intifada and First Intifada. Massive protests occurred on 9 October, when police killed 2 after protesters chanted slogans and pelted rocks at the security forces. Once the zenith of the protests became the death of protests after the bloody crackdown in the country's largest square, Tahrir Square which quashed the movement.

== See also ==
- Egyptian Revolution of 1919
- Egyptian Revolution of 2011
