= Egyptian Labour Corps mutinies =

British Army and Egyptian conscriptees conflicts

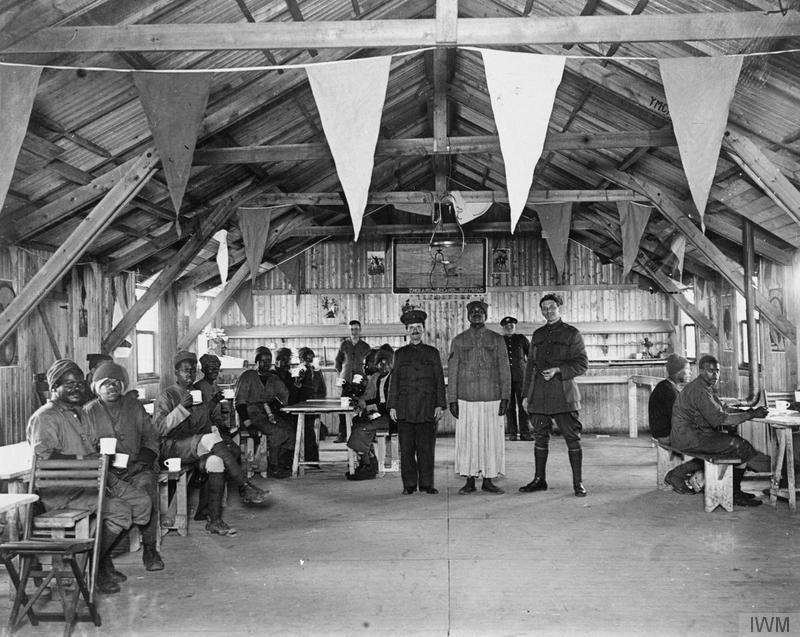
British soldiers and Egyptian Labour Corps men in a YMCA hut at Dunkirk, 24 May 1917

Members of the Egyptian Labour Corps (ELC) mutinied at their camps in France in 1917. The unit had been formed in the British protectorate of Egypt to provide non-combat labour to assist British forces in the First World War. Originally deployed to the Middle East and Dardanelles theatre, the unit was deployed to France from early 1917. Recruitment was ostensibly voluntary but became a form of conscription, with men being nominated by police and village leaders. ELC members remained civilians but were subject to military discipline and led by European officers. The contract of service was for six months, and counted from arrival at the place of work.

The first mutiny arose at Boulogne on 5 September the day after a German air raid struck the camp. Some 1,300 men of the 73rd and 78th Labour Companies refused to work, claiming their contracts had expired (as they counted the start as the date they left their homes). British troops were ordered to the camp and, upon their arrival on 6 September, ELC members attempted to break out and were fired upon, leaving 23 dead and ending the mutiny. A further mutiny arose on similar grounds in the 74th Labour Company at Calais on 10 September. Again British troops were called in and opened fire, killing at least 4 labourers. Another mutiny broke out in the Marseille camp of the 71st Labour Company on 15 September, with 500 labourers escaping camp. A party of 150 returned armed with sticks and led by labourer Mahmoud Mahomed Ahmed. Ahmed assaulted a British officer before being arrested. Further mutinies in the 74th, 75th and 76th Labour Companies on 25 October resulted in repatriation of the mutineers by the end of the year.

The British response to the mutinies was intentionally harsh because of the effects they had on supplies reaching the front lines of the Battle of Passchendaele, to try to dissuade other potential mutineers, and because of the risk of break-outs from nearby prisoner-of-war camps. In addition to the shootings, Ahmed was executed for mutiny and at least 35 labourers sentenced to imprisonment or hard labour. After the October mutiny the response softened and disaffected labourers were moved to rest camps. The "voluntary" enlistment system was abolished and replaced by a corvée system that helped reduce complaints of unfair selection of recruits.

== Background ==
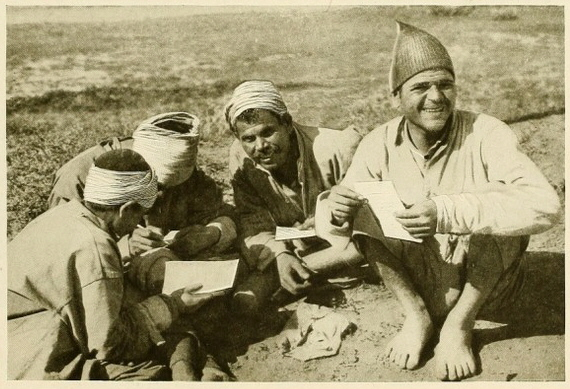
Egyptian Labour Corps men in Palestine

Since 1882 Britain had effective control over Egypt, which remained formally a Khedivate of the Ottoman Empire. After the Ottomans declared war against Britain in November 1914 a British protectorate was established over Egypt. A political decision was taken by Britain that Egyptians would not be employed as soldiers in the war but could be used for military labour, for which purposes the Egyptian Labour Corps was established. The unit was deployed initially to the Middle East and Dardanelles theatres but from 1917 shortages on the Western Front saw it deployed there.

Recruitment was initially and formally on a voluntary basis but evolved into de facto conscription with recruits designated by the police and village authorities. Men from Upper Egypt were enlisted on six-month contracts (from arrival at their place of work).

The labourers were classed as civilians but were organised on military lines and subject to military discipline which included the outlawing of strikes and, subject to court martial, physical punishment such as flogging. The unit was commanded by officers drawn from British and other European nationals residing in Egypt; they generally had little military experience. According to a British advisor with the Corps, Lieutenant-Colonel Malcolm Coutts, fluent in Arabic and familiar with Egyptian culture, the quality of non-commissioned officers in the unit was poor, he stated they were "mostly low class Europeans and Refugee Jews, with a sprinkling of Egyptians. Egyptians will not work for, or obey, this class of European; and Jews they utterly despise".

== In France ==
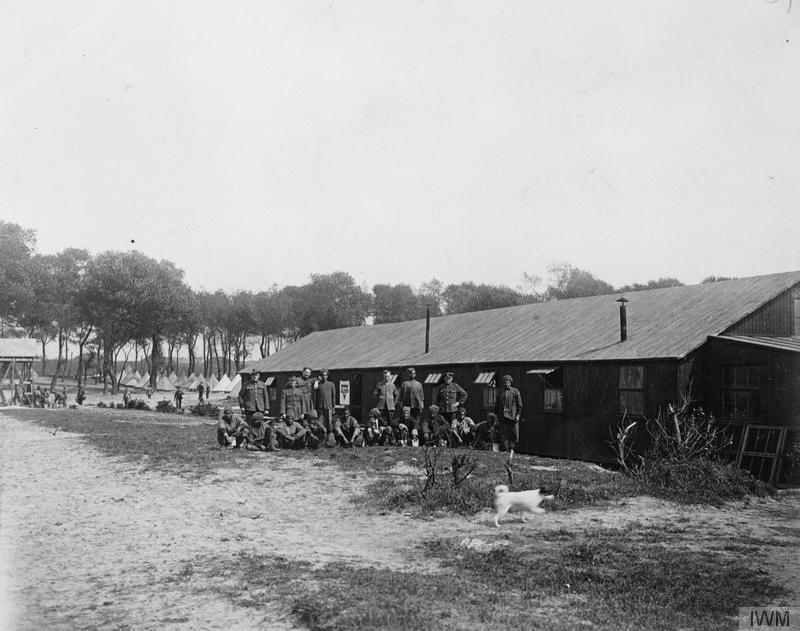
Egyptian Labour Corps men and British soldiers outside a hut at a camp in Dunkirk, 24 May 1917

The first ELC labourers arrived in France in early 1917, following a request from Field Marshal Douglas Haig. Around 1,000 labourers were deployed to a camp at Marseilles and 10,000 to camps in northern France, primarily to support the construction of railways and roads. The men were housed separately from the armed forces in hutted or tented camps enclosed in a barbed wire fence, patrolled by armed guards. The reason given for this was a desire to avoid access to alcohol, to prevent fighting with local civilians or British troops and to prevent the labourers from being influenced by what was perceived to be a lax attitude of nearby British labour units.

The later summer and early autumn of 1917 saw a shift in German air raids towards the British lines of communication. This included the labour units, some of which were subject to enemy action for the first time. On 4 September a raid on Dunkirk left 15 labourers of the Chinese Labour Corps (CLC) dead and 21 wounded. There was a reduction in output as dispersed survivors were gathered and persuaded to return to work. Three days later Chinese labourers launched an escape from a camp at nearby Calais.

=== 5–6 September mutiny ===
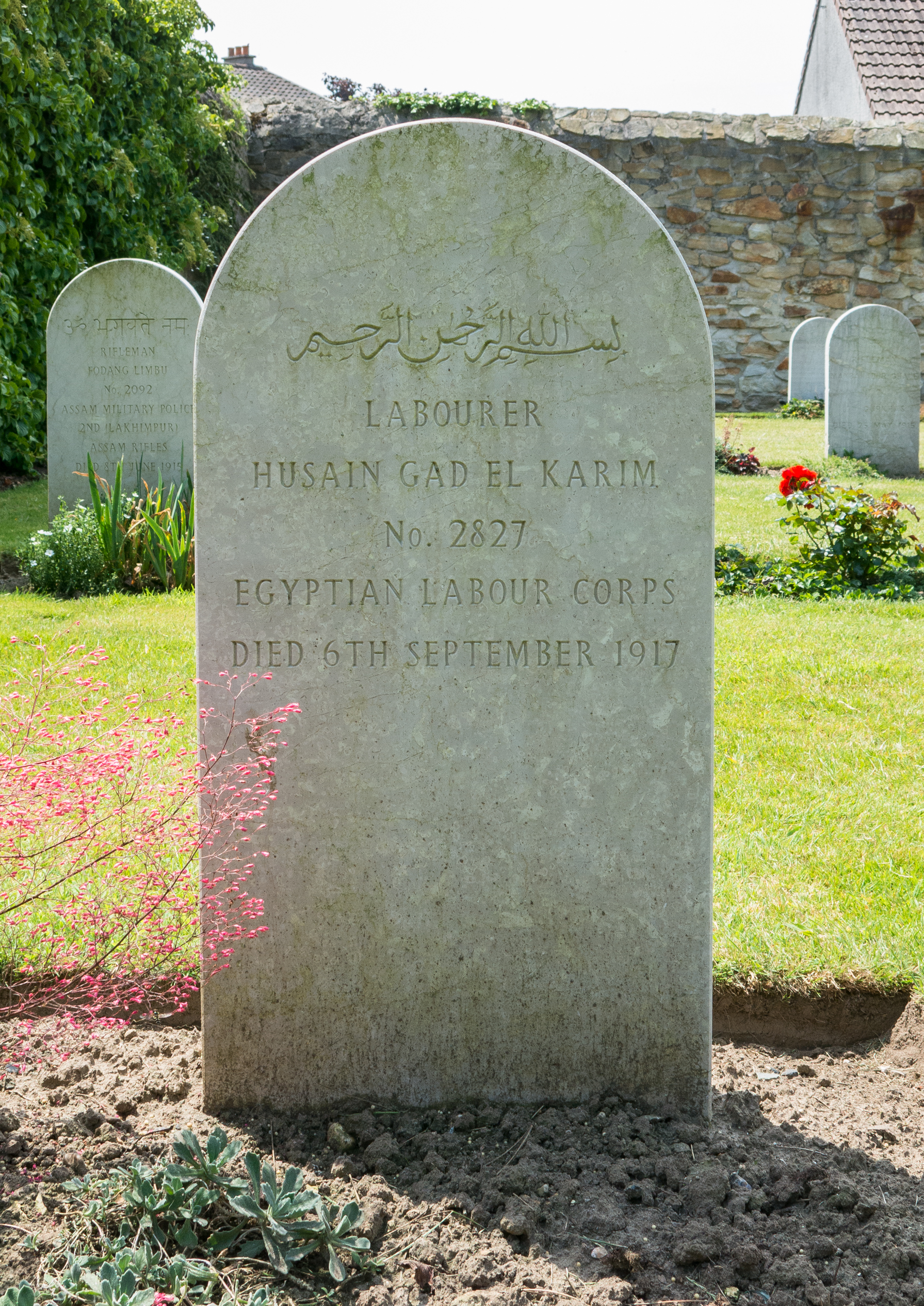
Grave of Labourer Husain Gad El Karim of the 73rd Labour Company, who died on 6 September 1917

The ELC camp at Boulogne was also struck by an air raid on 4 September. The following day 1,300 men of two companies (73rd and 78th) refused to work, claiming their contracts had expired as they counted the 6-month period from the day they left their home villages rather than arrival at the work front. They also claimed that promised leave to visit home had not been granted. Coutts attempted mediation with the mutineers that afternoon, to no effect, but promised to return to continue negotiations the following day. Coutts was overruled on this by the army's Deputy Director of Labour, Colonel E. C. Wace, who ordered the mutineers back to work and sent men of a British garrison battalion to the camp. Upon arrival of the soldiers the mutineers attempted to break out of the camp and were fired upon. The soldiers killed 23 members of the ELC and wounded 24, after which the remaining labourers agreed to return to work. Ten of the mutineers were court martialled on 6 September and found guilty of mutiny; they served 8 months of hard labour.

=== 10–11 September mutiny ===
The dispute over the start date for their contracts led the 74th Labour Company to mutiny at Calais on 10 September. They refused to report for work on the following day and attempted to leave their camp. Soldiers opened fire on the mutineers and 4–5 were reported killed and 15 wounded. The British authorities held 28 of the mutineers under arrest and tried them by court martial later that day; 25 were sentenced to imprisonment.

=== 16 September mutiny ===
A telegram from British Army headquarters in Cairo confirmed the terms of the labourers' contracts were six months from arrival in France. They also confirmed, that contrary to some opinions, the contract time was not restarted if the labourers were moved to a different camp. Officers of the ELC attempted to explain this to their men but this was not completed before 16 September when a further mutiny occurred in the 71st Labour Company at Marseille. The mutineers again claimed their contracts had expired and they should return to Egypt. The labourers were told to return to work otherwise they would be detained in France permanently and suffer flogging. A leader among the mutineers, labourer Mahmoud Mahomed Ahmed claimed he was told by Foreman Sergeant Sellek "you sons of dogs will be kept here by force", which sparked the mutiny. Around 500 labourers escaped the camp that evening.

A group of 50–150 labourers returned to the camp armed with sticks and were led by Ahmed, who had equipped himself with a rifle. The mutineers were confronted by ELC officers and NCOs, including Second Lieutenant Turley. Ahmed shouted "take that, you dog of a Christian" before striking Turley with a stick and knocking him down. Ahmed was overpowered by the NCOs and arrested, and act, with the sending of British and Indian troops to the camp, ended the mutiny.

Ahmed was charged with intent to murder, striking a superior officer and mutinous conduct. He was found guilty of the latter two charges at a court martial and sentenced to death. In his defence Ahmed, who had previously been sentenced to flogging for insubordination and rioting, claimed he had been told his contract was for seven months and he had worked longer than this. Haig confirmed the death sentence and Ahmed was executed by firing squad on 10 October.

=== 25 October mutiny ===
Further mutinies occurred in 74th, 75th and 76th Labour Companies on 25 October. These are regarded as being successful as all the labourers were repatriated to Egypt by the end of 1917.

== In other units and locations ==
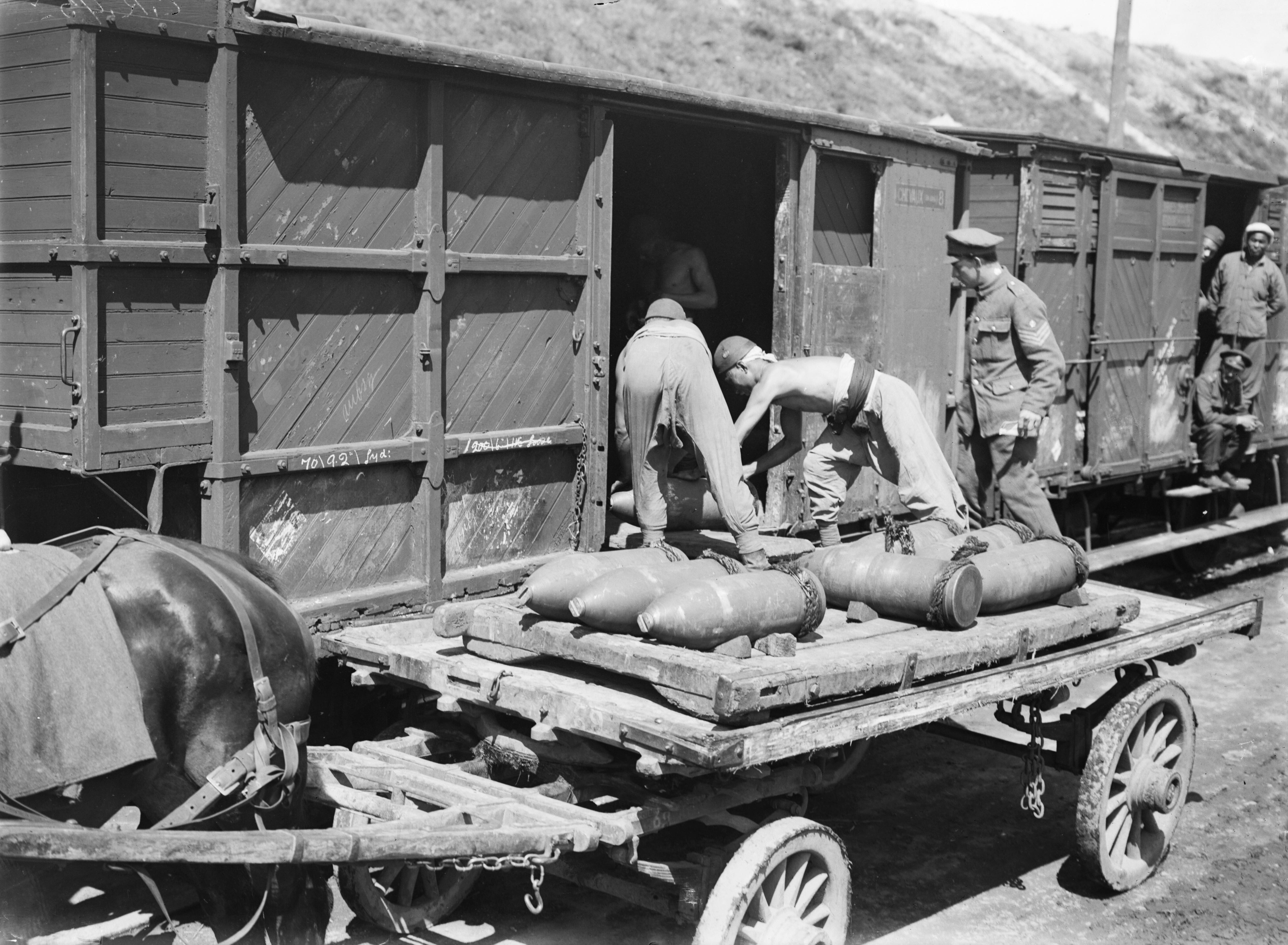
Chinese Labour Corps men unloading ammunition at Boulogne, 12 August 1917

Other labour corps' discipline issues also arose in 1917. The South African Native Labour Corps rioted in spring and members of the Chinese Labour Corps had refused orders, there were at least ten fatal incidents including one near Locre, Belgium, where soldiers of the Royal Welch Fusiliers shot and killed 3–8 Chinese labourers suspected of fleeing their camp. An article in the Daily News on 14 September called for an inquiry into the treatment of Chinese labourers but was dismissed by the army who falsely claimed that no armed force was used to persuade the labour corps to continue working. On 16 December a unit of Foot Guards shot dead 4 Chinese members of the 21st Labour Company at a camp near Les Fontinettes station; a Canadian Permanent Army Service Corps private was killed by crossfire.

The British response to the ELC and CLC mutinies in France in 1917 was deliberately harsh. The authorities were concerned that the withdrawal of labour delayed the movement of supplies to the front lines of the Battle of Passchendaele; that the mutinies could spread to other camps or could provide cover for escaping prisoners of war. The latter situation came to pass on 25 February 1918 when a riot at the Chinese Labour Corps' Audruicq camp, in which two labourers were wounded, led to the escape of four German prisoners from a nearby facility.

A further strike by the ELC occurred in Palestine at Yeghal, near Qalqilya. This was again sparked by disputes over contract dates and was subdued, without loss of life, by the deployment of mounted military police and 200 soldiers of the 34th Royal Sikh Pioneers.

== Legacy ==
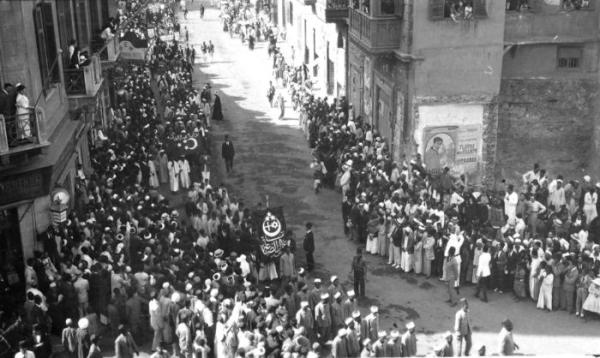
A demonstration in Egypt, 1919

After the October mutiny the British were less severe in their response and afterwards disaffected companies were moved to rest camps. On 1 November 1917, the contracts of Egyptian Labour Corps labourers became fixed at six months. As ELC troops were withdrawn from France the camp at Marseilles was closed on 23 February 1918. Consideration was given to raising two new ELC companies for service in Marseilles in June 1918 but issues finding volunteers in Egypt prevented this from proceeding. The "voluntary" enlistment system was replaced from July 1918 by the reintroduction of the corvée system of conscription for labour, an Ottoman-era system phased out by 1889. This reduced complaints about unfair selection of men for service in the ELC by village headmen. Resentment among former members of the ELC was one cause of the Egyptian revolution in March 1919.

The records of the Commonwealth War Graves Commission (CWGC) show the 23 labourers killed at Boulogne on 6 September belonged to the 73rd and 78th Labour Companies. They are buried in the CWGC's Meerut Military Cemetery at Saint-Martin-Boulogne and the civilian Boulogne Eastern Cemetery. CWGC records show that seven members of the 74th ELC died on 11 September and are buried at the CWGC's Les Baraques Military Cemetery, Sangatte. Ahmed is commemorated on a memorial at the Mazargues War Cemetery, Marseilles.

== See also ==
- 1917 French Army mutinies
