= 1968 uprising in Senegal =

1968 protest in Senegal

- Part of Protests of 1968
- Date: May 21, 1968 – June 5, 1968
- Location: Senegal
- Caused by: Killing of student and Poor conditions; Inspiration from Protests of 1968
- Goals: Resignation of President and government; Fresh general elections
- Methods: Demonstrations, Riots
- Result: Protests suppressed by force

Deaths and injuries
- Deaths: 28
- Injuries: 10+

The 1968 Senegal uprising was a nationwide revolutionary uprising that broke out after strikes led by young students in Dakar against a proposed scholarship law in universities and high schools turned into an anti-ruling class protest movement that led to a full-scale protest movement nationwide and large-scale violence and chaotic scenes in popular demonstrations. Looting and riots was witnessed during national protests and civil disobedience movement across the nation.

== Background ==
Students were angry at the government and its handling over the conditions and spiralling lifestyle conditions in Senegal and many have been comparing it with other nations. Rallies and marches are rare in Senegalese history, but this time, they would not let the government continue.

== Protests ==
Protests, fuelled by recession and economic downturn, turned into sustained street rallies, battles and occupations. Bloody protests against the ruling-class Senegalese in power turned violent as echoes of student unrest and mass civil dissent spread nationwide from Dakar.

Powerful demonstrations echoed throughout news media and working places; protesters rallied in violent protests and demonstrations demanding the fall of the regime. The student demonstrations that rocked Senegal was short-lived but intense as they used similar demands from the May 68 uprising in France.

Major protests against the military forces and the government continued and rioting erupted. After the killing of 28 demonstrators in June, protests were dispersed and uprisings sprung up nationwide. Nationwide and countrywide protests were taking place in early June, after 2 weeks of intense violence and deadly demonstrations. The movement was forcibly quelled by excessive amount of force.

== See also ==
- Protests of 1968
