= Protests of 1968 =

Worldwide escalation of social conflicts

- Part of the counterculture of the 1960s and the Cold War
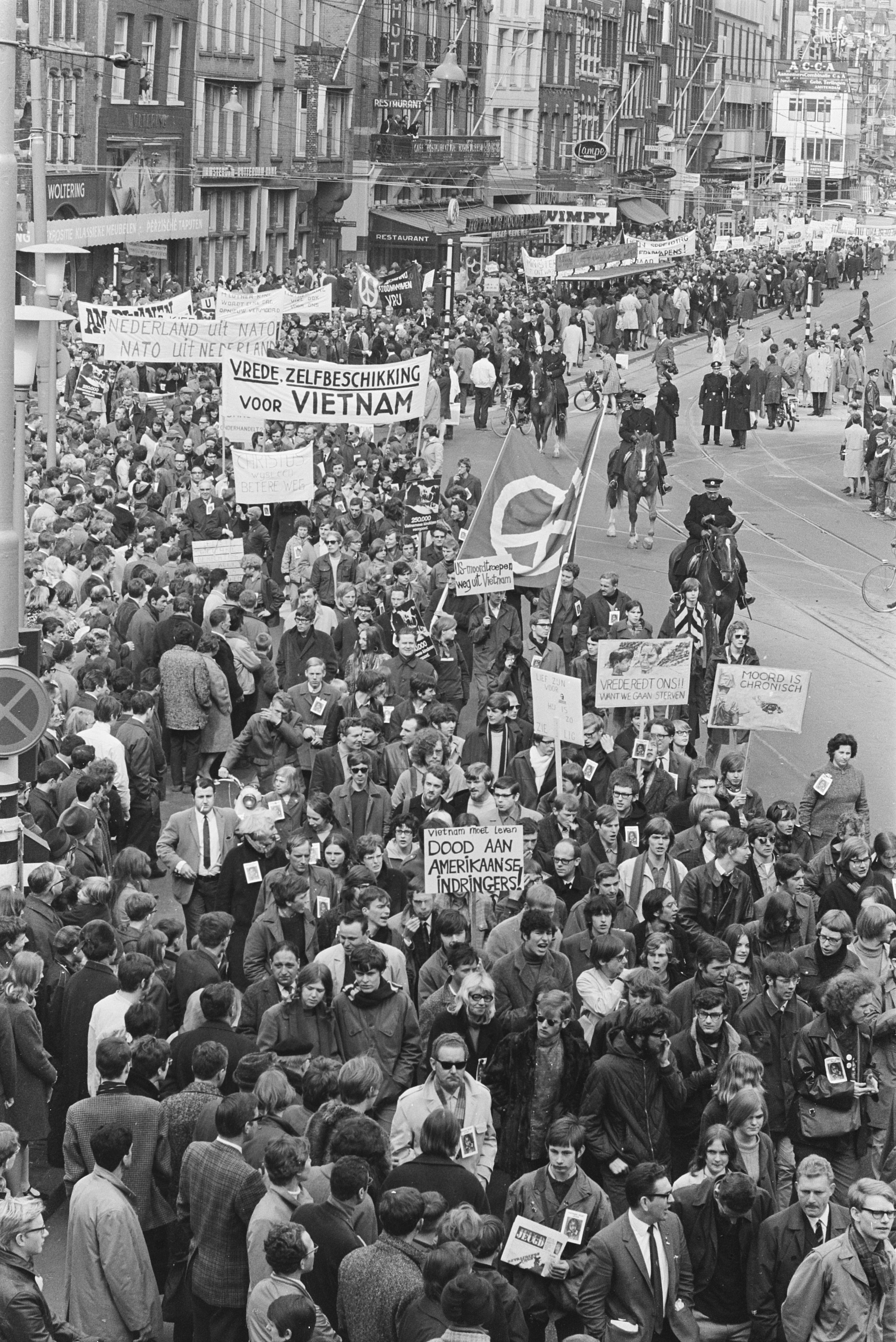
- Demonstrations against the Vietnam War in Amsterdam, 1968
- Date: 5 January 1968 – 29 March 1969 (1 year, 2 months, 3 weeks and 3 days)
- Location: Worldwide
- Caused by: Vietnam War; Apartheid; White Australia policy; Rhodesian Bush War; Racism; Perceived revisionism of Marxism; Lynching in the United States; Authoritarianism; Sexism; Orangeburg Massacre; Death of Che Guevara; Assassination of Martin Luther King Jr.
- Goals: Varied depending on country: Anti-authoritarianism; Anti-capitalism; Anti-communism (Eastern Europe); Anti-imperialism; Anti-racism; Anti-revisionism; Civil and political rights; Decolonization; Environmentalism; Feminism; Social liberalization; Socialism
- Result: Social revolutions (including the 1974 Carnation Revolution)

1968 saw a worldwide escalation of protests, which were predominantly characterized by the rise of left-wing politics, anti-war sentiment, civil rights urgency, youth counterculture within the Silent and baby boomer generations, and popular rebellions against military states and bureaucracies.

In the United States, the protests marked a turning point for the civil rights movement, which produced revolutionary movements like the Black Panther Party. In reaction to the Tet Offensive, protests also sparked a broad movement in opposition to the Vietnam War all over the United States as well as in London, Paris, Berlin and Rome. Mass movements grew in the United States but also elsewhere. In most Western European countries, the protest movement was dominated by students.

The most prominent manifestation was the May 1968 protests in France, in which students linked up with wildcat strikes of up to ten million workers, and for a few days, the movement seemed capable of overthrowing the Charles de Gaulle's government. In many other countries, struggles against dictatorships, political or sectarian tensions and authoritarian rule were also marked by protests in 1968, such as the beginning of the Troubles in Northern Ireland, the Tlatelolco massacre in Mexico City, and the escalation of guerrilla warfare against the military dictatorship in Brazil.

In the countries of Eastern Europe under communist parties, there were protests against lack of freedom of speech and violation of other civil rights by the communist bureaucratic and military elites. In Central and Eastern Europe, there were widespread protests that escalated, particularly in the Prague Spring in Czechoslovakia, in Warsaw, Poland, and in Yugoslavia. Outside the Western world there were protests in Japan, Egypt, and Pakistan.

== Background ==
Multiple factors created the protests in 1968. Many were in response to perceived injustice by governments—in the US, against the Johnson administration—and were in opposition to the draft, and the United States' involvement in the Vietnam War.

=== Post-war world ===
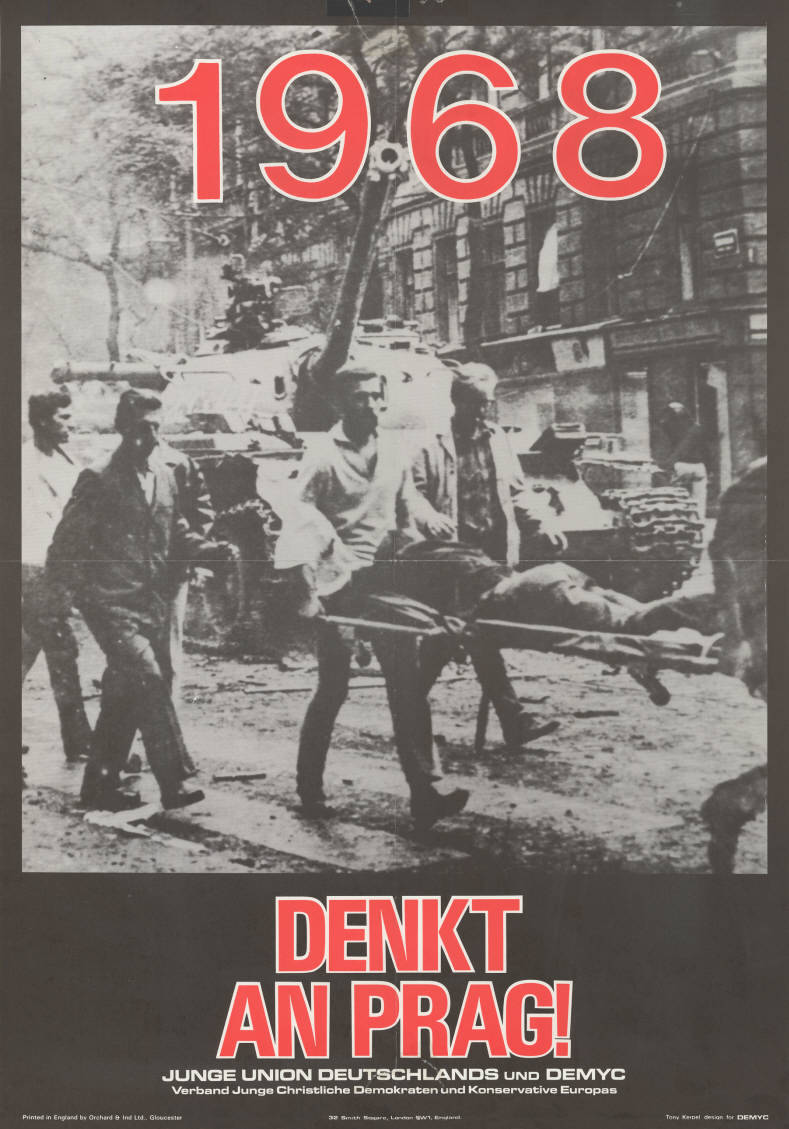
A 1968 Prague Spring poster by the Young Union, the youth wing of the West German Christian Conservatives

After World War II, much of the world experienced an unusual surge in births, creating a large age demographic. These babies were born during a time of peace and dramatic improvement in the economic situation for many major countries while at the same time there was a significant expansion of media—baby boomers were the first generation to have TV in their homes.

Television had a profound effect on this generation in two ways. First, it gave them a common perspective from which to view the world. The children growing up in this era shared the news and programs that they watched on television, and got glimpses of each other's worlds. Secondly, television allowed them to experience major public events. Public education was becoming more widely attended, creating another shared experience. Chain stores and franchised restaurants were bringing shared shopping and dining experiences to people in different parts of the world.

The Cuban Missile Crisis and the Cold War was another shared experience of this generation. The knowledge that a nuclear warfare could end their life at any moment was reinforced with classroom "duck and cover" bomb drills creating an omnipresent atmosphere of fear. As they became older, the anti-war, civil rights, peace, and feminist movement for women's equality were becoming forces in much of the world.

=== Social movements ===
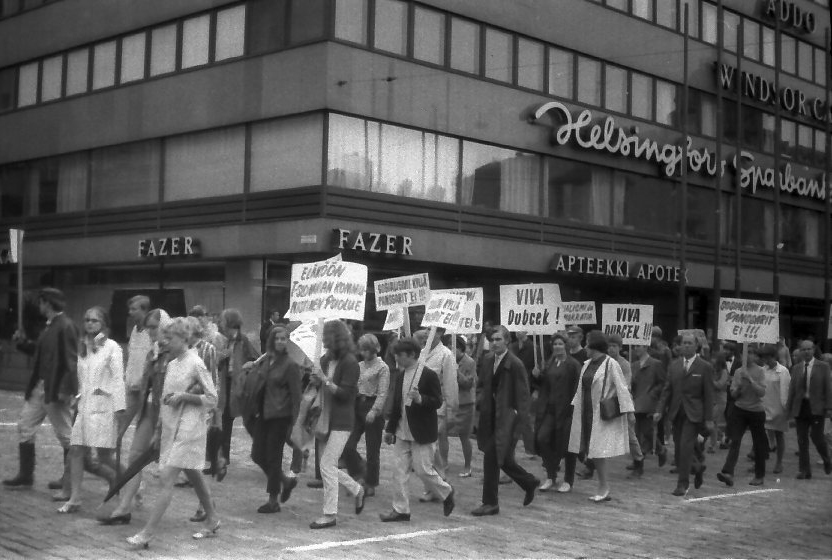
A Helsinki demonstration against the Warsaw Pact invasion of Czechoslovakia in 1968

The Eastern Bloc had already seen several mass protests in the decades following World War II, including the Hungarian Revolution, the uprising in East Germany and several labor strikes in Poland, especially important ones in Poznań in 1956.

Waves of social movements throughout the 1960s began to shape the values of the generation who were students during 1968. In America, the civil rights movement was at its peak, but was also at its most violent, such as the assassination of Martin Luther King Jr. on 4 April by alleged white supremacist James Earl Ray. In Northern Ireland, religious division paved the way for a decades-long violent conflict between Irish republicans and Irish unionists.

Italy and France were in the midst of a socialist movement. The New Left political movement was causing political upheavals in many European and South American countries. In China, the Cultural Revolution had reached its peak. The Arab–Israeli conflict had started in the early 20th century, the British anti-war movement had remained strong and African independence movements had continued to grow in number. In Poland in March 1968, student demonstrations at Warsaw University broke out when the government banned the performance of a play by Adam Mickiewicz (Dziady, written in 1824) at the Polish Theatre in Warsaw, on the grounds that it contained "anti-Soviet references". It became known as the March 1968 events.

The women's liberation movement caused generations of females to question the global status quo of unequal empowerment of women, and the post-war baby boomer generation came to reassess and redefine their priorities about marriage and motherhood. The peace movement made them question authority more than ever before. By the time they started college, the majority of young people identified with an anti-establishment culture, which became the impetus for the wave of rebellion and re-imagination that swept through campuses and throughout the world. College students of 1968 embraced progressive, liberal politics. Their progressive leanings and skepticism of authority were a significant impetus to the global protests of 1968.

Dramatic events of the year in the Soviet Bloc revealed that the radical leftist movement was ambivalent about its relationship to communism. The 2–3 June 1968 student demonstrations in Yugoslavia, were the first mass protest in the country after the Second World War. The authorities suppressed the protest, while President Josip Broz Tito had the protests gradually cease by giving in to some of the students' demands. Protests also broke out in other capitals of Yugoslav republics—Sarajevo, Zagreb, and Ljubljana—but they were smaller and shorter than in Belgrade.

In 1968, Czechoslovakia underwent a process known as the Prague Spring. In August 1968 during the Warsaw Pact invasion of Czechoslovakia, Czechoslovak citizens responded to the attack on their sovereignty with passive resistance. Soviet troops were frustrated as street signs were painted over, their water supplies mysteriously shut off, and buildings decorated with flowers, flags, and slogans like, "An elephant cannot swallow a hedgehog." Passers-by painted swastikas on the sides of Soviet tanks. Road signs in the country-side were over-painted to read, in Russian script, "Москва" (Moscow), as hints for the Soviet troops to leave the country.

On 25 August 1968 eight Russian citizens staged a demonstration on Moscow's Red Square to protest the Soviet invasion of Czechoslovakia. After about five minutes, the demonstrators were beaten up and transferred to a police station. Seven of them received harsh sentences up to several years in prison.

== Protests ==
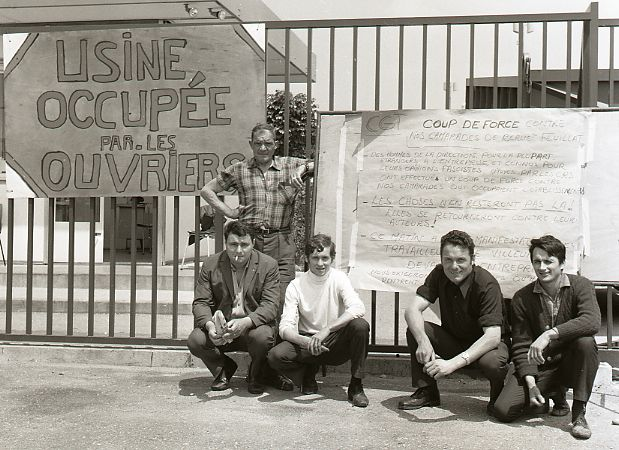
Strikers in Southern France with a sign reading "Factory Occupied by the Workers." Behind them is a list of demands.

The protests that raged throughout 1968 included a large number of workers, students, and poor people facing increasingly violent state repression all around the world. Liberation from state repression itself was the most common current in all protests listed below. These refracted into a variety of social causes that reverberated with each other: in the United States alone, for example, protests for civil rights, against nuclear weapons and in opposition to the Vietnam War, and for women's liberation all came together during this year. Television, so influential in forming the political identity of this generation, became the tool of choice for the revolutionaries. They fought their battles not just on streets and college campuses, but also on the television screen with media coverage.

As the waves of protests of the 1960s intensified to a new high in 1968, repressive governments through widespread police crackdowns, shootings, executions, and even massacres marked social conflicts in Mexico, Brazil, Spain, Poland, Czechoslovakia, and China. In West Berlin, Rome, London, Paris, Italy, many American cities, and Argentina, labor unions and students played major roles and also suffered political repression.

=== Mass movements ===
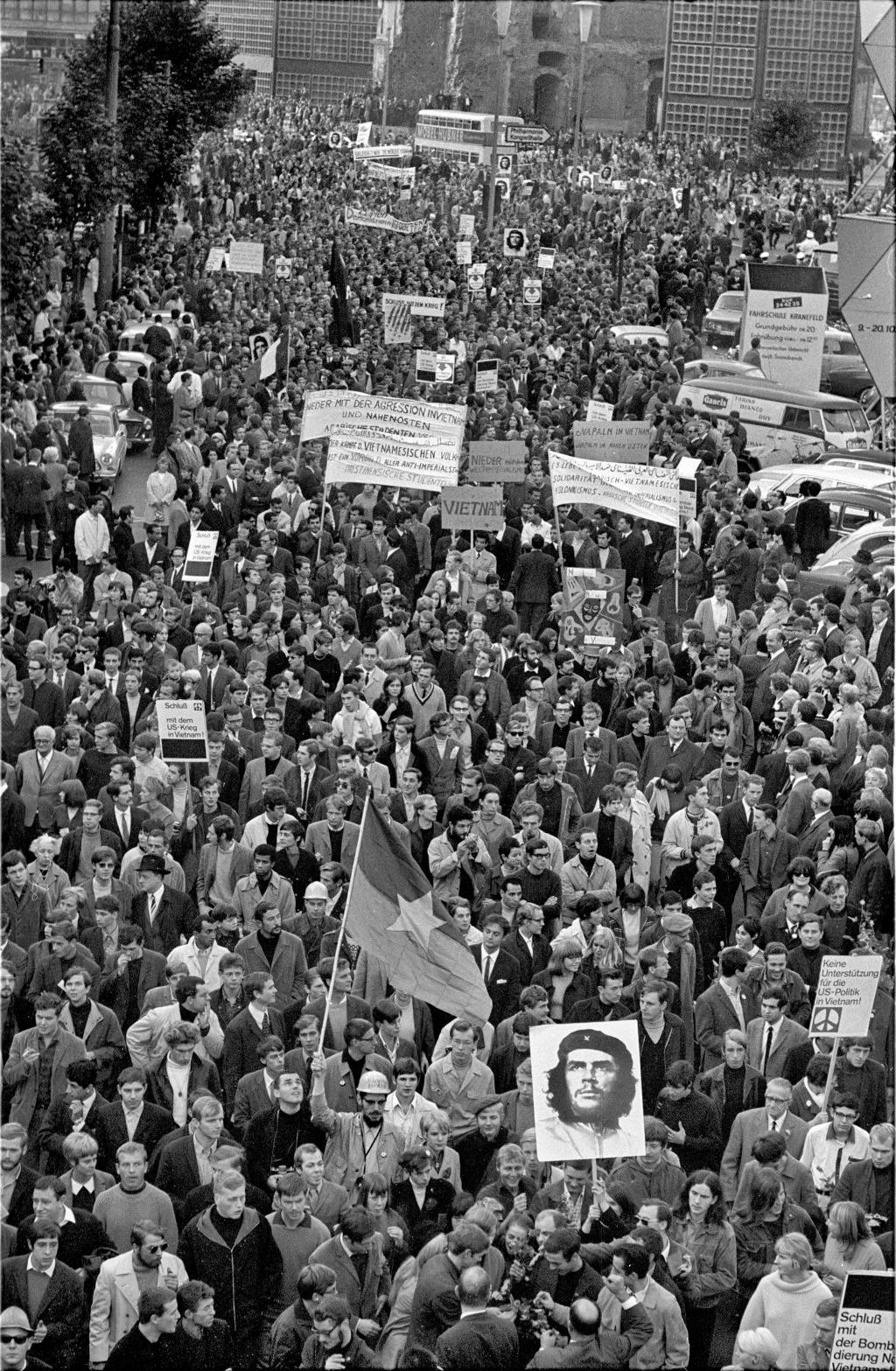
A protest against the Vietnam War in West Berlin in 1968

The environmental movement can trace its beginnings back to the protests of 1968. The environmental movement evolved from the anti-nuclear movement. France was particularly involved in environmental concerns. In 1968, the French Federation of Nature Protection Societies and the French branch of Friends of the Earth were formed and the French scientific community organized Survivre et Vivre (Survive and Live). The Club of Rome was formed in 1968. The Nordic countries were at the forefront of environmentalism. In Sweden, students protested against hydroelectric plans. In Denmark and the Netherlands, environmental action groups protested about pollution and other environmental issues. The Northern Ireland civil rights movement began to start, but resulted in the conflict now known as The Troubles.

In January, police used clubs on 400 anti-war/anti-Vietnam protesters outside of a dinner for U.S. Secretary of State Rusk. In February, students from Harvard, Radcliffe, and Boston University held a four-day hunger strike to protest the Vietnam war. Ten thousand West Berlin students held a sit-in against American involvement in Vietnam. People in Canada protested the Vietnam War by mailing 5,000 copies of the paperback, Manual for Draft Age Immigrants to Canada to the United States.

On 6 March, five hundred New York University (NYU) students demonstrated against Dow Chemical because the company was the principal manufacturer of napalm, used by the U.S. military in Vietnam. On 17 March, an anti-war demonstration in Grosvenor Square, London, ended with 86 people injured and 200 demonstrators arrested. Japanese students protested the presence of the American military in Japan because of the Vietnam War.

In March, British students opposing the Vietnam War, physically attacked the British Defense Secretary, the Secretary of State for Education and the Home Secretary. In August, the 1968 Democratic National Convention in Chicago was disrupted by five days of street demonstrations by thousands of protesters. Chicago's mayor, Richard J. Daley, escalated the riots with excessive police presence and by ordering up the National Guard and the army to suppress the protests.

On 7 September, the women's liberation movement gained international recognition when it demonstrated at the annual Miss America beauty pageant. The protest and its disruption of the pageant gave the issue of equal rights for women significant attention and signaled the beginning of the end of "beauty pageants" as any sort of aspiration for young females, and 'square' themed content in general.

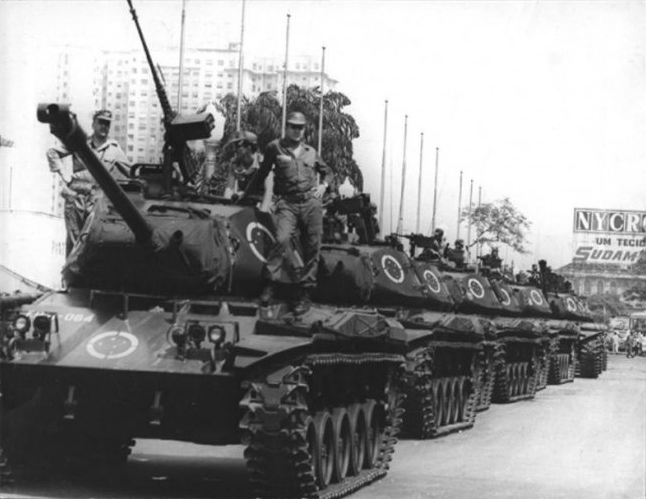
Tanks in Rio de Janeiro during protests in memory of Edson Luís de Lima

=== Brazil ===
On March 28, the Brazilian Military Police killed high school student Edson Luís de Lima Souto during a protest for cheaper meals at a restaurant for low-income students. The consequences of his death generated one of the first major protests against the military dictatorship in Brazil, known as the March of the One Hundred Thousand, and incited a nationwide wave of anti-dictatorship student demonstrations throughout the year.

=== Czechoslovakia and the Soviet Union ===
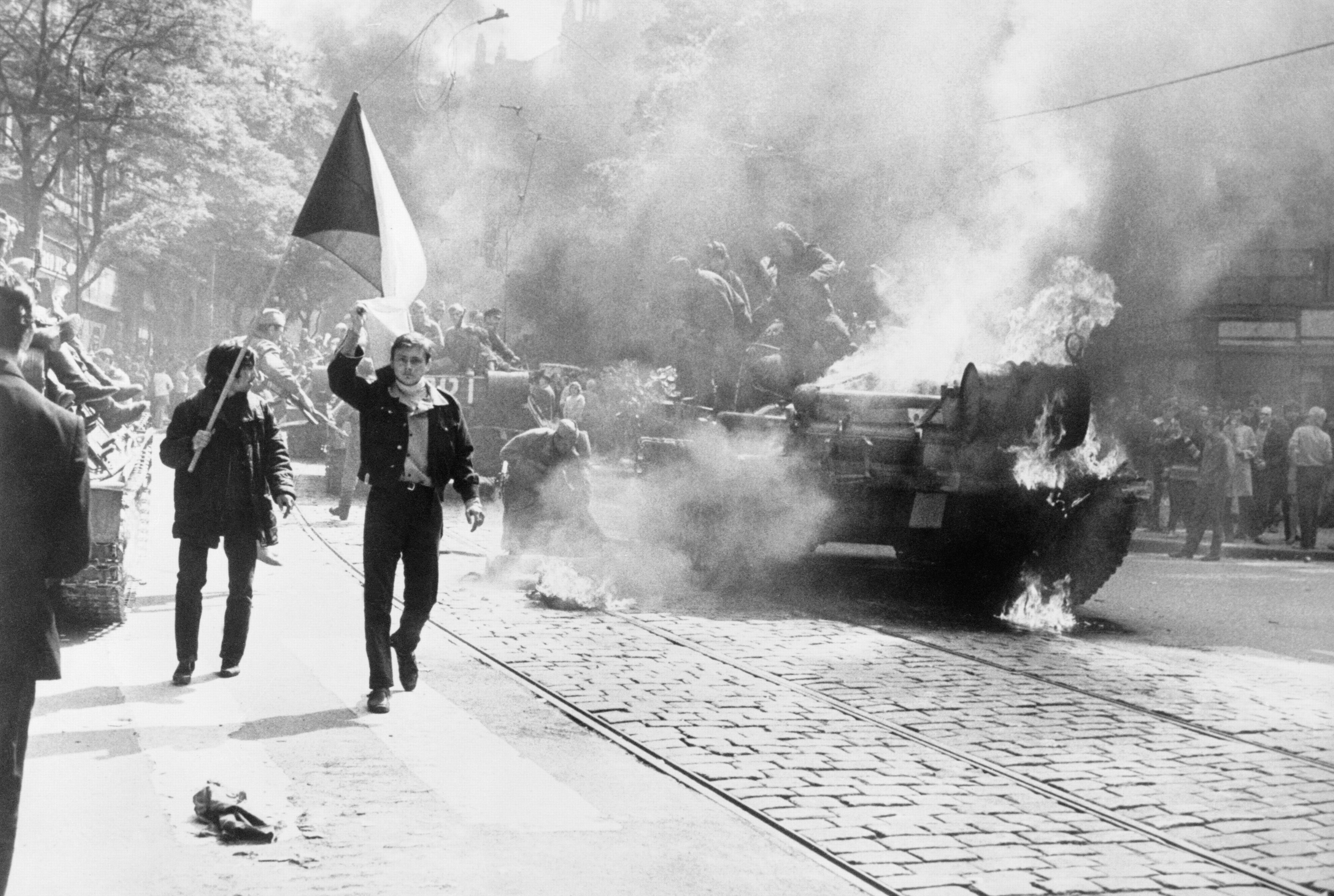
Czechoslovaks carrying a national flag past a burning Soviet tank in Prague

In what became known as Prague Spring, Czechoslovakia's first secretary Alexander Dubček began a period of reform, which gave way to outright civil protest, only ending when the USSR invaded the country in August. On 25 August, anti-war protesters gathered in Red Square only to be dispersed. It was titled the 1968 Red Square demonstration.

=== France ===
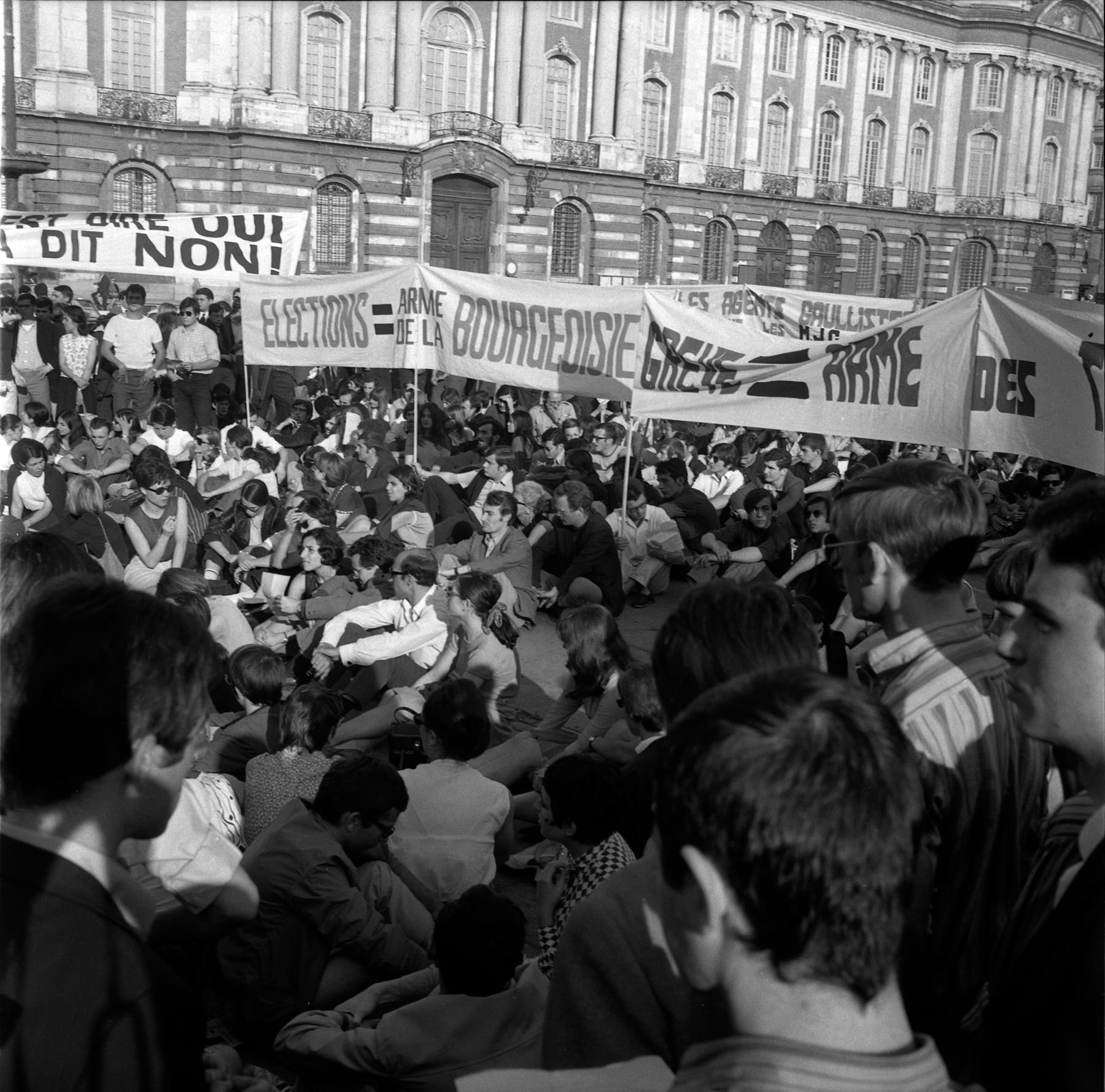
Demonstrators during the May 1968 protests in Toulouse

The May 1968 protests in France began with student mobilizations against rigid university rules and conservative social values. Subsequently, the movement expanded with the participation of workers, resulting in general strikes that paralyzed the country and placed the government in a serious political crisis.

=== Italy ===
On 1 March, a clash known as the Battle of Valle Giulia took place between students and police in the faculty of architecture in the Sapienza University of Rome. In March, Italian students closed the university for 12 days during an anti-war protest.

=== Japan ===
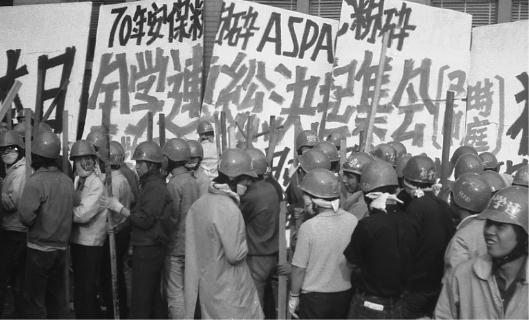
Japanese student protests in June 1968

Protests in Japan, organized by socialist student group Zengakuren, were held against the Vietnam War starting 17 January, coinciding with the visit of the USS Enterprise to Sasebo. In May, violent student protests erupted at multiple Japanese universities, having started earlier in the year from disputes between faculty and students for more student rights and lower tuition fees. Students occupied buildings and clashed with staff, holding "trials" in public.

=== Mexico ===
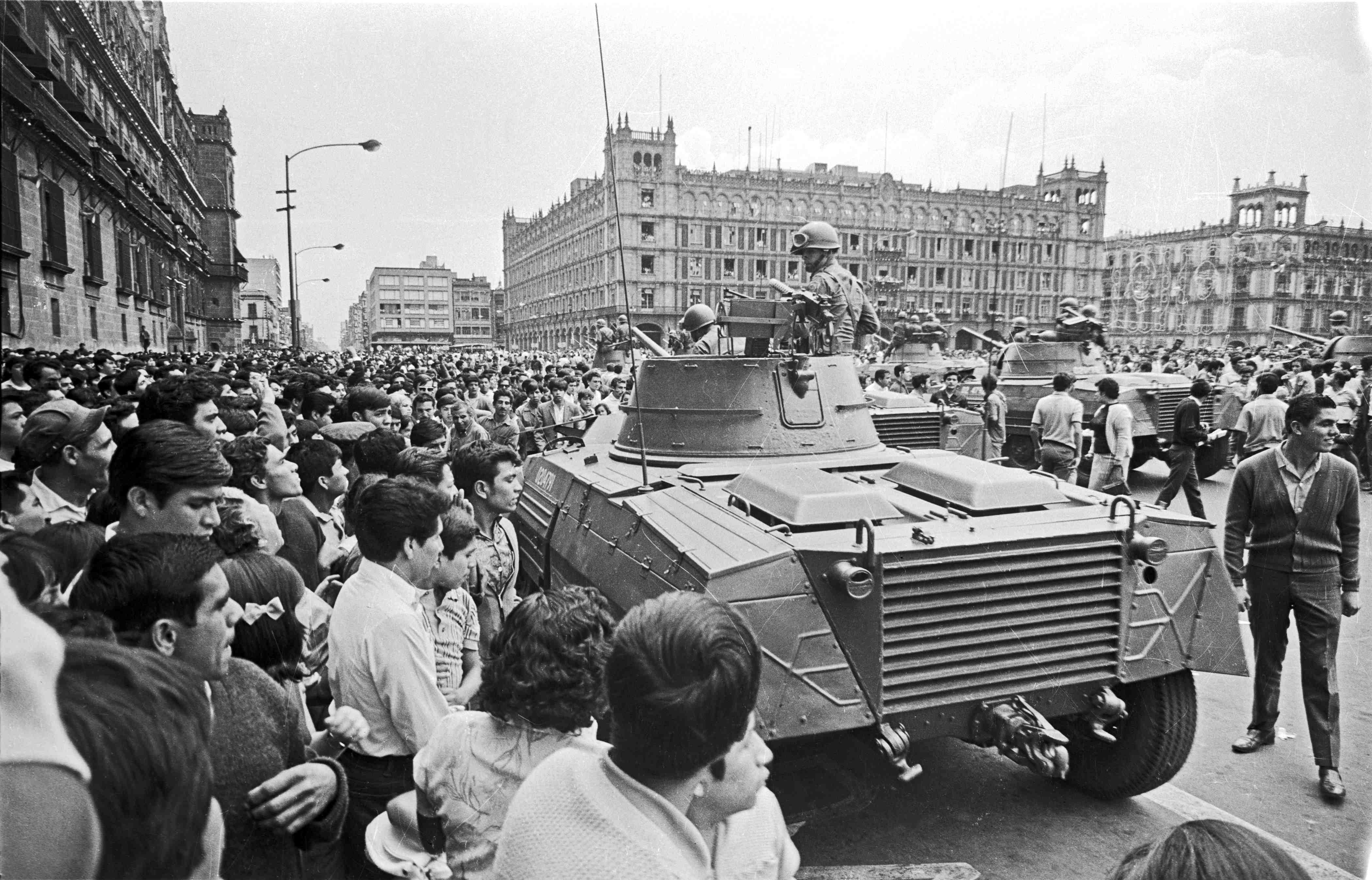
Armored vehicles in the main square of Mexico City, circa 1968

Mexican university students mobilized to protest Mexican government authoritarianism and sought broad political and cultural changes in Mexico. The entire summer leading up to the opening of the 1968 Summer Olympics had a series of escalating conflicts between Mexican students with a broad base of non-student supporters and the police. Mexican president Gustavo Díaz Ordaz saw the massive and largely peaceful demonstrations as a threat to Mexico's image on the world stage and to his government's ability to maintain order.

On 2 October, after a summer of protests against the Mexican government and the occupation of the central campus of the National Autonomous University (UNAM) by the army, a student demonstration in Tlatelolco Plaza in Mexico City ended with police, paratroopers and paramilitary units firing on students, killing and wounding an undetermined number of people. The suppression of the Mexican mobilization ended with the 2 October massacre and the Olympic games opened without further demonstrations, but the Olympics themselves were a focus of other political issues.

The admittance of the South African team brought the issue of Apartheid to the 1968 Summer Olympics. After more than 40 teams threatened to boycott, the committee reconsidered and again banned the South African team. The Olympics were targeted as a high-profile venue to bring the Black Movement into public view. At a televised medal ceremony, black U.S. track stars John Carlos and Tommie Smith each raised one black-gloved hand in the black power salute, and the U.S. Olympic Committee sent them home immediately, albeit only after the International Olympic Community threatened to send the entire track team home if the USOC did not.

=== Pakistan ===
In November 1968, the mass student movement erupted in Pakistan against the military dictatorship of Ayub Khan. The movement was later joined by workers, lawyers, white-collar employees, prostitutes, and other social layers. The movement was noted by prominent Marxist political theorist and activist Lal Khan to have displayed unprecedented class solidarity, with "the prejudices of religion, sex, ethnicity, race, nationality, clan or tribe evaporated(ing) in the red heat of revolutionary struggle".

In 1968, at the height of the movement against him, young protesters in Karachi and Lahore began describing Ayub Khan as a dog ("Ayub Khan Kutta!"). Troops opened fire, killing dozens and injuring hundreds of students and workers. In March 1969, Ayub Khan resigned and handed power to Army chief Yahya Khan.

=== Poland ===
On 30 January 300 student protesters from the University of Warsaw and the National Theater School were beaten with clubs by state arranged anti-protestors. On 8 March, the 1968 Polish political crisis began with students from the University of Warsaw who marched for student rights were beaten with clubs. The next day over two thousand students marched in protest of the police involvement on campus and were clubbed and arrested again. By 11 March, the general public had joined the protest in violent confrontations with students and police in the streets. The government fought a propaganda campaign against the protestors, labeling them Zionists. The 20 days of protest ended when the state closed all of the universities and arrested more than a thousand students. Most Polish Jews left the country to avoid persecution by the government.

=== South Africa ===
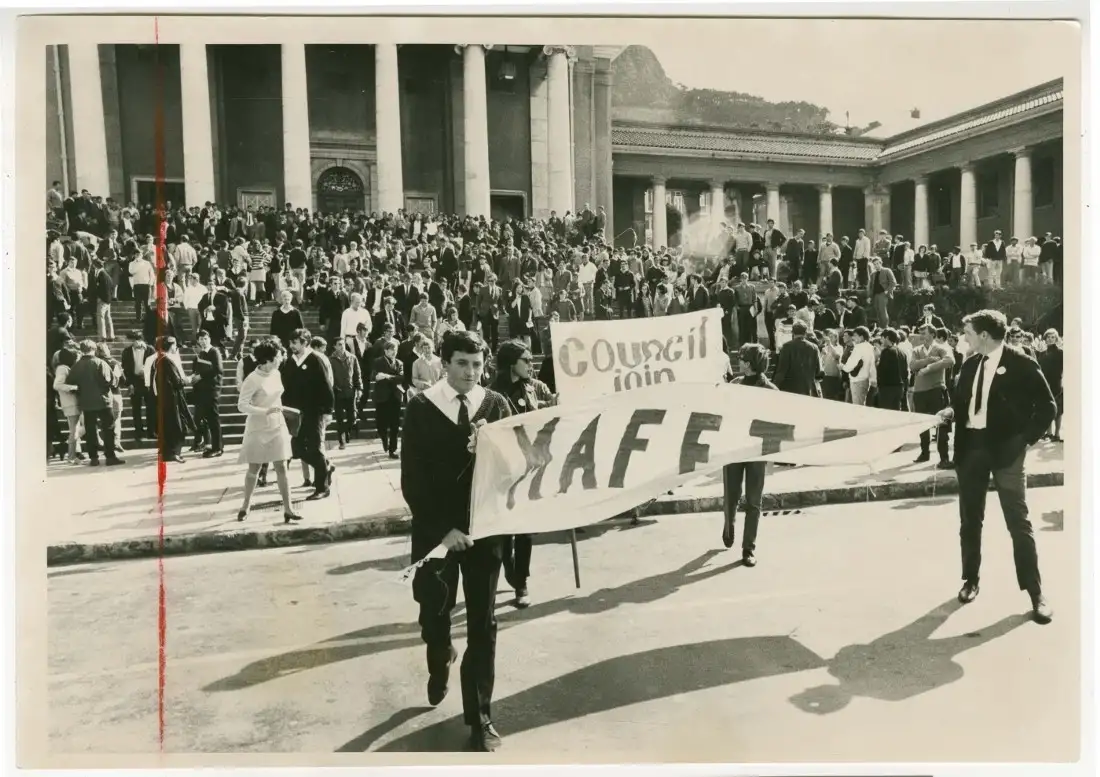
UCT's students surrounding Jameson hall on 15 August 1968

In South Africa, the (white-only) University of Cape Town (UCT) Council's decision to rescind Archie Mafeje's (black) offer for a senior lecturer position due to pressure from the Apartheid government angered students and led to protests on 15 August 1968 followed by a nine-day sit-in at the UCT administration building. Protesters faced intimidation from the government, anti-protestors, and fellow Afrikaans students from other universities. The police swiftly squashed support for the sit-in. In the aftermath, Mafeje left the country and did not return until 2000.

=== Spain ===
Compared to other countries, the repercussions of 1968 were much smaller in Spain, mostly being protests and strikes repressed by Franco's regime. Workers were joined by students at the University of Madrid to protest the involvement of police in demonstrations against dictator Francisco Franco's regime, demanding democracy, trade unions and worker rights, and education reform. In April, Spanish students protested against the actions of the Franco regime in sanctioning a mass for Adolf Hitler. At the beginning of spring the University of Madrid was closed for thirty-eight days due to student demonstrations.

=== Sweden ===
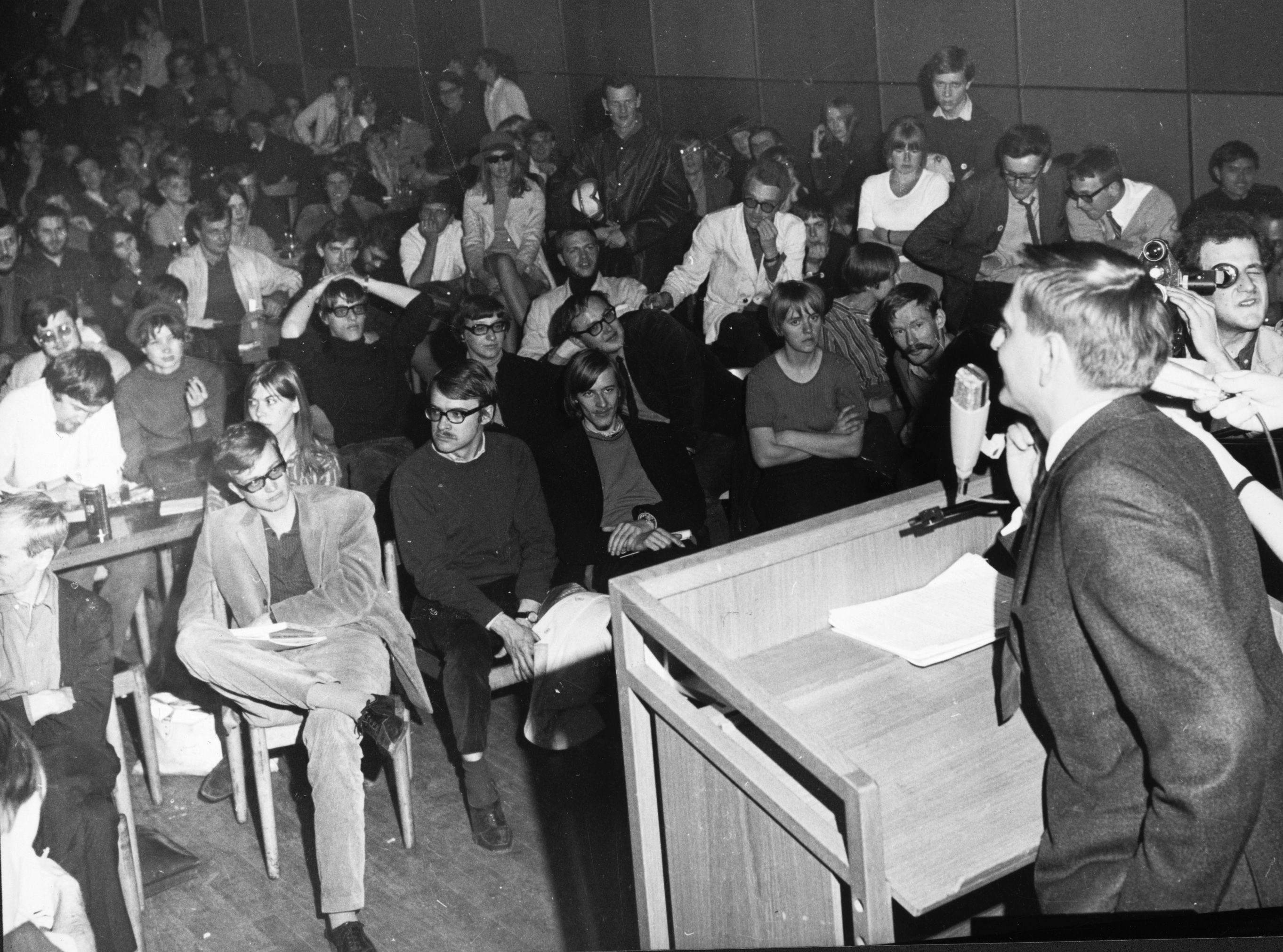
At the occupation of the Student Union Building in Stockholm, Olof Palme encourages students to embrace democratic values.

On 3 May activists protested the participation of two apartheid nations, Rhodesia and South Africa, in the international tennis competition held in Båstad, Sweden. The protest was among the most violent between Swedish police and demonstrators during the 1960s, resulting in a dialogue between the Swedish Government and organizers to curb the escalation of violence. The match was later played in secrecy, with Sweden winning 4–1.

At Stockholm University leftist students occupied their Student Union Building at Holländargatan from 24–27 May to send a political message to the government. Inspired by the protests in France earlier that month, the Stockholm protests were calmer than those in Paris. In reaction to the protests, right-wing students organized Borgerliga Studenter, or "Bourgeois Students", whose leaders included future prime ministers Carl Bildt and Fredrik Reinfeldt. The Student Union building would later be absorbed by the Stockholm School of Economics.

=== Tunisia ===
In Tunisia, a wave of student-led demonstrations and street protests in front of campuses began in March, inspired by protests in Poland and the 1968 protests in Egypt. Student protests, however, were quelled by police and the movement was crushed; in the short-lived period there were peaceful protests and demonstrations for one week.

=== United Kingdom ===
A series of art school occupations quickly spread throughout the UK during May and July 1968. The occupation at Hornsey College of Art (now Middlesex University) remains an emblematic event in the modern history of British universities. Cambridge students were involved in the Garden House riot on 13 February 1970.

==== Northern Ireland ====
On 24 August 1968, the Northern Ireland civil rights movement held its first civil rights march, from Coalisland to Dungannon. Many more marches were held over the following year. Loyalists (especially members of the UPV) attacked some of the marches and held counter-demonstrations in a bid to get the marches banned. Because of the lack of police reaction to the attacks, nationalists saw the RUC, almost wholly Protestant, as backing the loyalists and allowing the attacks to occur. On 5 October 1968, a civil rights march in Derry was banned by the Northern Ireland government. When marchers defied the ban, RUC officers surrounded the marchers and beat them indiscriminately without provocation. More than 100 people were injured, including a number of nationalist politicians.

The incident was filmed by television news crews and shown around the world. It caused outrage among Catholics and nationalists, sparking two days of rioting in Derry between nationalists and the RUC. A few days later, a student civil rights group – People's Democracy – was formed in Belfast. In late November, O'Neill promised the civil rights movement some concessions, but these were seen as too little by nationalists and too much by loyalists. These protests started turning violent, and a year later, the 1969 Northern Ireland riots marked the beginning of The Troubles, a sectarian conflict that would divide Northern Ireland for roughly 30 years.

=== United States ===
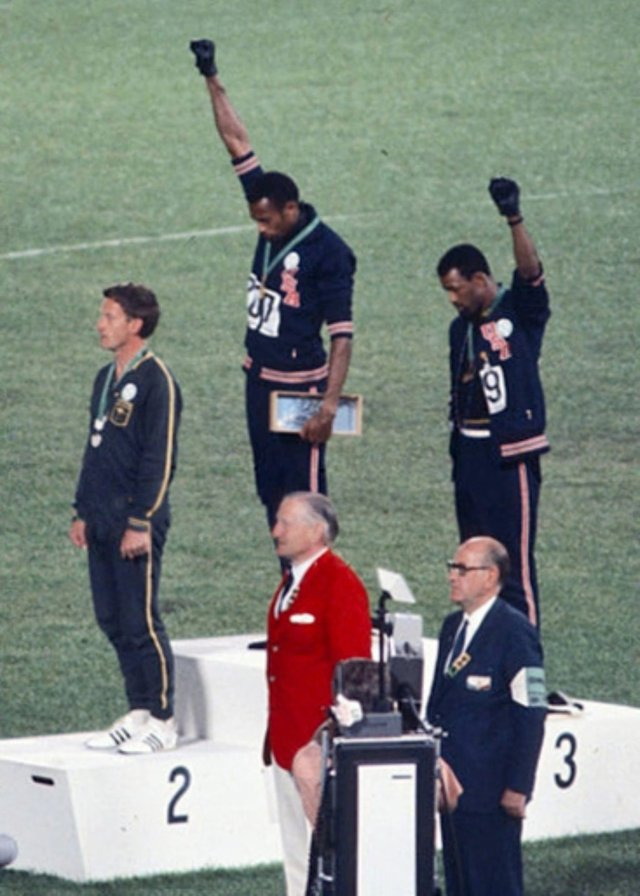
Award ceremony at the 1968 Mexico City Olympics

In the United States, the Civil Rights Movement had turned away from the south and toward the cities in the north and west with the issues of open housing and the Black Consciousness Movement. The civil rights movement unified and gained international recognition with the emergence of the Black Power and Black Panthers organizations. The Orangeburg massacre on 8 February 1968, a civil rights protest in Orangeburg, South Carolina, turned deadly with the death of three college students. In March, students in North Carolina organized a sit-in at a local lunch counter that spread to 15 cities.

In March, students from all five public high schools in East L.A. walked out of their classes protesting against unequal conditions in Los Angeles Unified School District high schools. Over the next several days, they inspired similar walkouts at fifteen other schools.

On 4 April, the assassination of Martin Luther King Jr. sparked violent protests in more than 100 American cities, notably Louisville, Baltimore and Washington, D.C. On 23 April, students at Columbia University protested and alleged the university had racist policies; three school officials were taken hostage for 24 hours. This was just one of a number of Columbia University protests of 1968.

The August 1968 Democratic National Convention became the venue for huge demonstrations against the Vietnam War and the Johnson Administration. It culminated in a riot, seen as part of television coverage of the convention, when Chicago police waded into crowds in front of the convention center and beat protesters as well as assaulted media figures in the building. At the 1968 Summer Olympics during a televised medal ceremony, track stars John Carlos and Tommie Smith each raised gloved fists in solidarity with black power, which resulted in their suspension from the Olympics.

=== West Germany ===
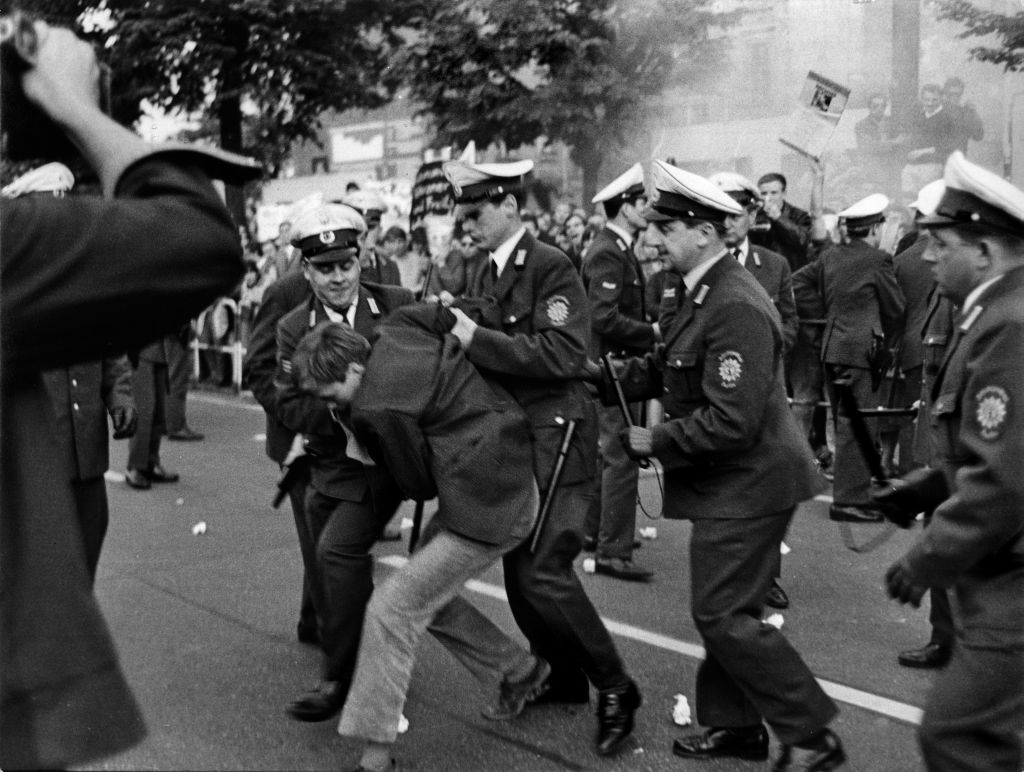
Student protest in West Berlin

The West German student movement were largely a reaction against the perceived authoritarianism and hypocrisy of the West German government and other Western governments, particularly in relation to the poor living conditions of students. Students in 108 West German universities protested to get recognition of East Germany, the removal of government officials with Nazi pasts and for the rights of students. In February, protests by professors at the University of Bonn demanded the resignation of the university's president because of his involvement in the building of concentration camps during the war.

=== Yugoslavia ===
Protests in Yugoslavia, primarily centered at the University of Belgrade, had a significant impact on the political landscape under the leadership of Josip Broz Tito.

In 1968, Yugoslavia was under a unique communist self-management system, with Tito as its leader since the end of World War II. Despite enjoying relative independence from Soviet control, there were tensions within the country related to economic challenges, growing inequality, and authoritarianism. Students, in particular, felt frustrated by the gap between the promises of socialism and the reality of social and economic hardships.

Particular grievances focused on the following points:

1. Social and economic inequality: Despite the self-management system, a gap between the political elites and the general population, especially workers and youth, was growing.
2. Education access: The expanding educational system wasn't providing sufficient employment opportunities for the growing number of young graduates, creating discontent among students.
3. Influence of international movements: Protests in countries like France and Czechoslovakia influenced Yugoslav students, who also began to call for democratic reforms.
4. Criticism of Tito's leadership: While Tito was admired for keeping Yugoslavia independent from Soviet control, students started criticizing aspects of his regime, particularly corruption and political repression.

The protests began on 2 June 1968, in Belgrade, following a small clash between students and the police over a canceled theater performance. As police violence escalated, more students joined in, and the protests spread to other Yugoslav cities, such as Ljubljana and Zagreb. Protesters demanded better living conditions, economic equality, greater access to education, and freedom of expression. They carried slogans like "Down with the Red Bourgeoisie" and "We refuse to live in a world where man exploits man."

Initially, Tito's government responded with force, deploying police and military to suppress the protests. However, as the protests grew, Tito shifted to a more conciliatory approach. On 9 June 1968, in a televised address, Tito surprised the nation by acknowledging some of the students' grievances and expressing support for certain reforms. Despite Tito's conciliatory rhetoric, once the protests subsided, his government did not implement substantial reforms. In the months that followed, the government tightened its control over universities and suppressed dissenting voices.

Ultimate, the protests resulted in the following:

- Domestic politics: Although Tito made some concessions, significant reforms were not enacted, and the government increased surveillance over students and dissident groups. Nonetheless, the protests raised awareness of economic inequality and the lack of genuine democracy in the country.
- Student movement: The student movement lost momentum after Tito's speech, but underlying discontent with the regime persisted. In the 1970s, Yugoslavia faced more economic problems and ethnic tensions, which ultimately contributed to its disintegration in the 1990s.
- International influence: The 1968 protests in Yugoslavia demonstrated that even in a communist state seen as more progressive and liberal than other Eastern Bloc countries, significant social and political tensions existed, and there was a growing demand for reform.

The 1968 protests are seen as a critical moment in Yugoslavia's history, highlighting the regime's failure to adapt to the demands of a new generation. Despite living under socialism, young people felt marginalized and disillusioned. The protests also foreshadowed the political and social challenges that Tito's successors would face after his death in 1980.

These protests revealed the cracks within the Yugoslav socialist system and signaled the difficulties the country would experience in the following decades, leading to its eventual breakup.

=== Jamaica ===
In October, the Rodney riots in Kingston, Jamaica, were inspired when the Jamaican government of Hugh Shearer banned Guyanese university lecturer Dr. Walter Rodney from returning to his teaching position at the University of the West Indies. Rodney, a historian of Africa, had been active in the Black power movement, and had been sharply critical of the middle class in many Caribbean countries. Rodney was an avowed socialist who worked with the poor of Jamaica in an attempt to raise their political and cultural consciousness.

=== Turkey ===
The Generation ’68 or the 1968 movement in Turkey, reflecting the protests of 1968, included major Marxist–Leninist figures such as İbrahim Kaypakkaya, Mahir Çayan, Deniz Gezmiş, and Behice Boran. The movement initially emerged as a student movement within universities and later evolved into armed conflict, particularly in the Eastern Anatolia Region, with the formation of organizations such as the People's Liberation Army of Turkey. The political and social climate created by the Generation ’68 also contributed to the conditions leading to the establishment of the Kurdistan Workers' Party and influenced the context of the 1980 Turkish coup d'état and Political violence in Turkey (1976–1980). The armed conflicts associated with the generation include the Kurdistan Workers' Party insurgency, the Maoist insurgency in Turkey, and the DHKP/C insurgency in Turkey. The Generation ’68 influenced the development of the Kurdish problem as a major political topic in Turkey in its modern form and deeply changed the trajectory of Turkey's modern history.

== See also ==
- 1967 Long Hot Summer
- Long march through the institutions
- 1968 Democratic National Convention protest activity
- 1968 Miami riot
- 1968 uprising in Senegal (occurred in same year)
- 1969 Cordobazo (which occurred the next year in Argentina)
- 1969 Hot Autumn (which occurred the next year in Italy)
- 2024 pro-Palestinian protests on university campuses
- A Grin Without a Cat
- American Power and the New Mandarins, book by Noam Chomsky
- Arab Spring
- Assassination of Fred Hampton
- Axel Springer AG
- Carlos Marighella
- Catonsville Nine
- Chicago Seven
- Civil Rights Act of 1968
- Counterculture of the 1960s
- Days of Rage
- Feminism in France
- Fluxus
- George Floyd Protests
- Give Peace a Chance
- Glenville Shootout
- Happening
- Hippies
- Kent State Shootings
- List of incidents of civil unrest in the United States
- Opposition to the Iraq War
- Revolutions of 1848
- Revolutions of 1917–1923
- Revolutions of 1989
- Rudi Dutschke
- Situationist International
- Stonewall riots (which occurred the next year)
- Summer of Love, summer of 1967 in San Francisco
- Yippies

== General references ==
- Croker, Richard (2007), The Boomer Century, New York: Springboard Press
- Kurlansky, Mark (2004), 1968: The Year That Rocked the World, New York: Random House Publishing Group
