= 1968 protests in Egypt =

The 1968 protests in Egypt involved general strikes and protests against Gamal Abdel Nasser's government, demanding an end to corruption. On 9 June 1967, Nasser had resigned after Egypt was defeated by Israel in the Six-Day War. The next day, hundreds of thousands of his supporters rallied him to stay. Protests started in Helwan in February 1968 and quickly swept the country. The unrest lasted until March, when the army quelled it.

== See also ==
- 1919 Egyptian revolution
- Protests of 1968
- 2011 Egyptian revolution
