= 1919 Egyptian revolution =

1918–1919 revolution in Egypt

- Part of the revolutions of 1917–1923
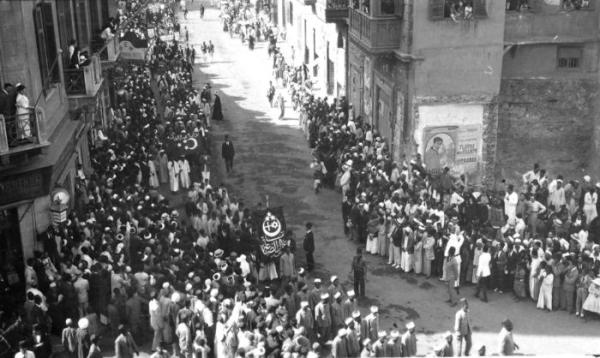
- Demonstration in Egypt in 1919
Date	November 1918 – July 23, 1919
Location	Sultanate of Egypt
Result	See § Aftermath: Unilateral Declaration of Egyptian Independence; Implementation of the 1923 Constitution of Egypt
Territorial changes	Egypt becomes formally independent but remains a de facto British protectorate

Belligerents
United Kingdom: Sultanate of Egypt; Sudan; Australia; New Zealand	Egyptian protesters: Wafd Party

Commanders and leaders
(British Empire) Reginald Wingate	Saad Zaghloul

Casualties and losses
- 29 British servicemen killed 114 British servicemen injured 1 Australian serviceman killed 31 European civilians killed
- 800 killed 1,600

The 1919 Egyptian revolution (Arabic: ثورة 1919, Thawra 1919) was a nation-wide revolution in the Sultanate of Egypt against British occupation that lasted from November 1918 to July 1919. Occurring right after the end of World War I, the revolution served as the culmination of successive decades of opposition by Egyptian nationalists to occupation, and was directly sparked by the British-ordered exile of Wafd Party leader Saad Zaghloul and several other party members.

The revolution was successfully countered by British forces. However, Britain's High Commissioner for Egypt nevertheless felt negotiations were needed to quell the crisis. Ultimately, the United Kingdom would grant subsequent recognition of Egyptian independence in 1922 as the Kingdom of Egypt, and the implementation of a new Egyptian constitution in 1923. The British government, however, retained significant levels of influence in Egypt and refused to recognize full Egyptian sovereignty over Sudan or to withdraw British forces from the Suez Canal. These factors would continue to sour Egypt–United Kingdom relations in the decades leading up to the Egyptian revolution of 1952.

== Background ==
The Ottoman Empire had nominal sovereignty over Egypt Eyalet since the 1500s, but in practice Egypt became quite autonomous, especially after the rise to power of Muhammad Ali in 1803–1807 which saw Ottoman influence largely severed. Ottoman influence continued to be nominal at best after the 1882 Anglo-Egyptian War and the subsequent British occupation and influence on the region. From 1883 to 1914, the Khedive of Egypt and Sudan under the nominal Ottoman Sultan remained the official ruler of the country, but ultimate power was exercised by the British Consul-General.

During the reign of Muhammad Ali, Egypt industrialized significantly, becoming considerably more secular in the process. One result of this was the expansion of literacy to groups of women who had otherwise been isolated from ideas of secularism and political self-determination. Over a number of years dubbed "The Women's Awakening" literacy rates as well as the number of publications that read and directed towards women increased dramatically. Many of these publications carried heavy feminist themes and would contribute considerably to the involvement of women in the 1919 Revolution.

When the Caucasus campaign of World War I broke out between the Russian Empire and the Ottoman Empire, the British authorities in Egypt declared martial law and implemented several policies which led to the Egyptian economy being harnessed to the British war effort. On 14 December 1914, the Khedivate of Egypt was elevated to a separate level of Sultanate of Egypt, and declared as a British protectorate, thus terminating definitively the legal fiction of Ottoman sovereignty over its province of Egypt. The terms of the protectorate led Egyptian nationalists to believe that it was a temporary arrangement that would be changed after the end of the war through bilateral agreement with the British.

== Causes ==
Before World War I, nationalist agitation in Egypt was limited to the educated elite. The outbreak of the conflict caused several issues with the political landscape of Egypt. The British authorities attempted to form a Legislative Assembly that would've better represented native Egyptian interests, albeit with limited political power. Due to the outbreak of the war, the assembly would be disregarded. Many Egyptians were also frustrated with the rule of Fuad I who had in 1917 ascended to the title of Sultan of Egypt following the death of his predecessor, Hussein Kamel I. Their issues with his rule stemmed from his refusal to support any reforms and his acceptance of the British protectorate.

The religious and economic conditions of many Egyptian people had also begun to deteriorate after the outbreak of the war. Living costs were only raised by the conflict and the distribution of cocaine and heroin amongst the population skyrocketed. In addition to this many of the religious needs of Egyptian Muslims were completely ignored by Western companies in Egypt, who often disregarded requests of leave for the Hajj, among other slights against the Islamic faith. The British authorities had also requisitioned 3.5 million pound sterling from the Egyptian treasury to support the British war efforts.

During the war, dissatisfaction with the British occupation spread among all classes of the population, a result of Egypt's increasing involvement in the war despite Britain's promise to shoulder the entire burden alone. This was most noticeable with the creation of the Egyptian Labour Corps (ELC), which consisted largely of Egyptian agricultural workers and performed manual labour during the Middle Eastern theatre of World War I. Many were sent to labor camps hundreds of miles away from their own home, and were often mistreated by their overseers who heavily restricted the workers' freedoms. A total of around one and a half million Egyptians would be a part of the Labour Corps. The treatment of the members of the ELC's would contribute greatly to rhetoric used by Egyptian revolutionaries in 1919, who dubbed their treatment as a form of slavery.

During the war, the British government stationed thousands of imperial troops in Egypt, conscripted over one and a half million Egyptians into the Labour Corps, and requisitioned buildings, supplies and animals fight on different fronts for use in the war effort. In addition, because of Allied promises during the war (such as U.S. President Woodrow Wilson's "Fourteen Points"), Egyptian political classes prepared for self-government.

== Events ==
Shortly after the First World War armistice on 11 November was concluded on the Western Front in Europe, a delegation of Egyptian nationalist activists led by Saad Zaghlul made a request to High Commissioner Reginald Wingate to end the British Protectorate in Egypt and Sudan, and gain Egyptian representation at the planned peace conference in Paris. The delegation also included 'Ali Sha'rawi Pasha, Abd al-Aziz Fahmi Bey, Muhammad 'Ali Bey, 'Abd al-Latif al-Makabati Bey, Muhammad Mahmud Pasha, Sinut Hanna Bey, Hamd Pasha al-Basil, George Khayyat Bey, Mahmud Abu al-Nasr Bey, Mustafa al-Nahhas Bey and Dr. Hafiz 'Afifi Bey. There they hoped to push for full Egyptian independence.

Meanwhile, a mass movement for the full independence of Egypt and Sudan was being organised at a grassroots level, using the tactics of civil disobedience. By then, Zaghlul and the Wafd Party enjoyed massive support among the Egyptian people. Wafdist emissaries went into towns and villages to collect signatures authorizing the movement's leaders to petition for the complete independence of the country.

Since the beginning of the war, the British authorities had declared martial law in Egypt and still held considerable powers after the conflict's end. Seeing the popular support that the Wafd Party leaders enjoyed, and fearing social unrest, the British administration proceeded to arrest Zaghlul on 8 March 1919 and exiled him with two other party leaders to Malta. In the course of widespread disturbances which followed between 15 and 31 March, at least 800 people were killed, numerous villages were burnt down, large landed properties plundered and railways destroyed by angered Egyptian mobs. "The result [of the arrest] was revolution," according to noted professor of Egyptian history, James Jankowski.

As a response to British violence, the Deir Mawas incident occurred on 18 March, 1919, when Egyptian revolutionaries attacked a train carrying British troops, resulting in the death of eight individuals including three British officers (a colonel, a major, and a lieutenant) and five soldiers.

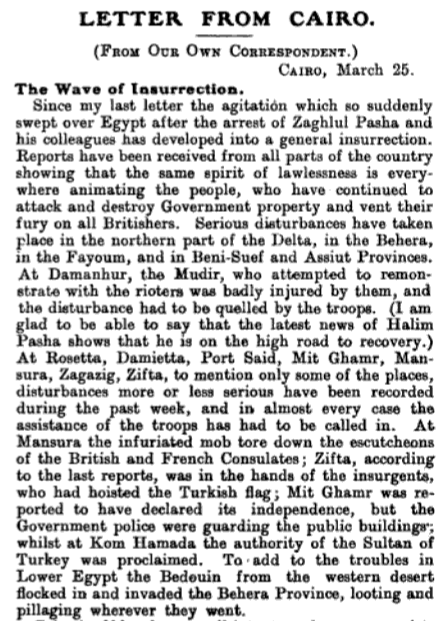
The Near East journal published a report in its 1919 issue entitled “The Wave of Insurrection” in which it discussed the spread of unrest in Egypt after the exile of Saad Zaghlul and his companions.

For several weeks until April, demonstrations and strikes across Egypt by students, elite, civil servants, merchants, peasants, workers, and religious leaders became such a daily occurrence that normal life was brought to a halt. This mass movement was characterized by the participation of both men and women, and by spanning the religious divide between Muslim and Christian Egyptians. The uprising in the Egyptian countryside was more violent, involving attacks on British military installations, civilian facilities, and personnel. During this period, some Egyptian cities declared independence in rejection of the British occupation, such as Mit Ghamr. The Egyptian Expeditionary Force, a British imperial formation stationed in the region, engaged in mass repression to restore order. The initial response to the revolution was by the Egyptian police force in Cairo, although control was handed off to Major-General H. D. Watson and his military forces in the city within a few days. By 25 July 1919, 800 Egyptians were killed, and 1,600 others were wounded. Heavy-handed police suppression of the riots were often justified by claims that the police were only putting down Egyptian "rabble" who engaged not in genuine political protest but rather in shortsighted rioting and looting. This claim is not widely accepted by most modern scholars.

On April 7, 1919, Saad Zaghlul and his allies were released from exile and allowed to return to Egypt. This caused a number of demonstrations that celebrated his return, although British authorities again cracked down on them, with the result that several more deaths occurred. Upon returning, Zaghlul helped to develop an underground network of spies that supported the revolution, consisting of agents in the British administration as well as the Sultan's Palace and more. Dubbed the Intelligence Department, this organization headed by Abd al-Rahman Fahmi would also help organize protests against anti-Wafd newspapers.

Forces led by General Bulfin and General Allenby would successfully manage to quell the revolution. However, Allenby, who would succeed Wingate as High Commissioner for Egypt, favored negotiations.

The British government under Prime Minister David Lloyd George, sent a commission of inquiry, known as the Milner Commission, to Egypt in December 1919, to determine the causes of the disorder, and to make a recommendation about the political future of the country. The commission was concluded in May 1920 after facing a large number of protestors. Lord Milner's report to Lloyd George, the Cabinet and King George V, published in February 1921, recommended that the protectorate status of Egypt was not satisfactory and should be abandoned.

Despite having been allowed to return to Egypt since 1919 Saad Zaghlul would return on April 4, 1921. He rejected any attempts at resolving the conflict made by the government, demanding several conditions for the independence of the Egyptian state. The vast majority of protests were completely on Zaghlul's side. British authorities would offer him the position of Egyptian Sultan with the caveat of British oversight and he resoundingly rejected it. Because of this the British again exiled him, this time to the Seychelles.

The revolts forced London to undertake the Milner Mission, which would lead to a unilateral declaration of Egyptian independence on 28 February 1922.

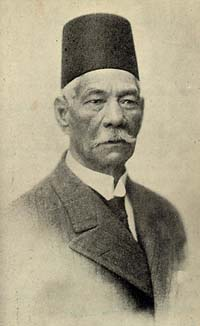
Saad Zaghlul Pasha

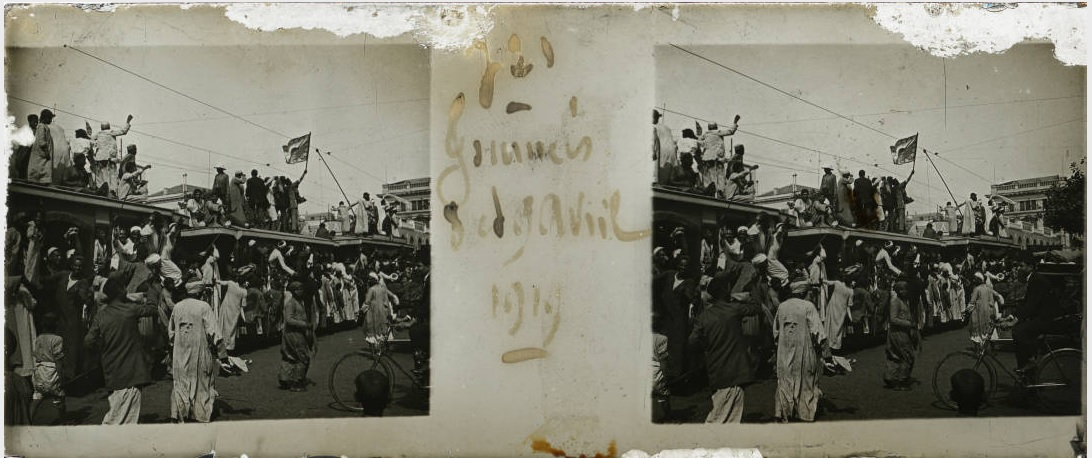
Protesters during the Egyptian revolution of 1919

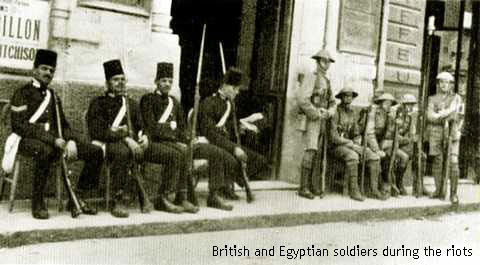
Egyptian and British soldiers on standby during the riots

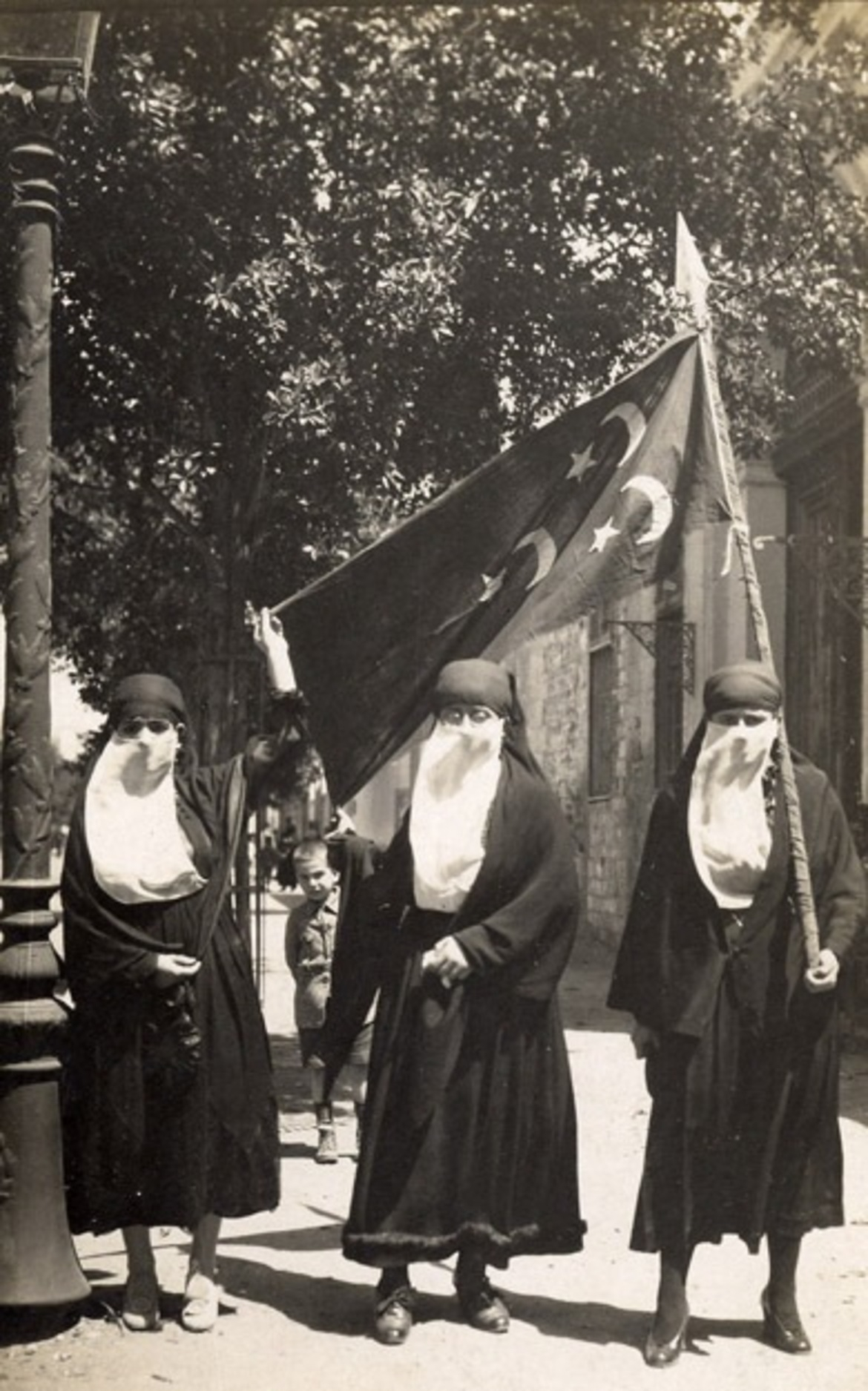
Egyptian women demonstrating during the revolution

The revolution flag of Egypt from 1919. It bears a crescent and cross to demonstrate that both Muslims and Christians supported the Egyptian nationalist movement against British occupation.

== Aftermath ==
In March 1920, the Italian Regency of Carnaro sent 250,000 rifles to Egyptian nationalists, as part of the Regencies project of the League of Fiume.

The revolts eventually forced London to issue a declaration of Egyptian independence on 28 February 1922. After this Fuad I declared his own declaration of Egyptian independence and established himself as King of Egypt despite public apathy. A large amount of the Egyptian public was still outraged over the continued exile of Saad Zaghlul, who had not been allowed to return despite this new supposed independence. Despite the British government recognizing Egypt as an independent sovereign state, it held on to these powers: the security of the communications of the British Empire in Egypt; defending Egypt against foreign aggression; and protecting foreign interests in Egypt and the Sudan. This caused public support in the new "independent" Kingdom of Egypt to remain considerably low.

The Wafd Party drafted a new constitution in 1923 based on a parliamentary representative system. Egyptian independence at this stage was nominal, as British forces continued to be physically present on Egyptian soil. Moreover, Britain's recognition of Egyptian independence directly excluded Sudan, which continued to be administered as an Anglo-Egyptian condominium. However following the creation of the new constitution, British authorities allowed for the release of Saad Zaghlul from exile. He would return on September 17, 1923, and go on to be elected Prime Minister of Egypt in 1924.

Although the revolution in 1919 failed to expel British influence from the nation, many Egyptians celebrated it as a significant step towards their own self-determination. Yet trust in the Egyptian monarchy would struggle to recover and the following decades would find more hardships for Egypt, culminating in the Free Officers movement and Egyptian revolution of 1952.

== See also ==
- Egyptian revolution of 1952
- 2011 Egyptian revolution
- History of modern Egypt
- Mustafa Kamil Pasha
- Egyptian nationalism
- Black Hand (Egypt)
- List of modern conflicts in the Middle East
- 1935–1936 protests in Egypt
- 1968 protests in Egypt
- 2000 uprising in Egypt
