= Landremont =

- Commune
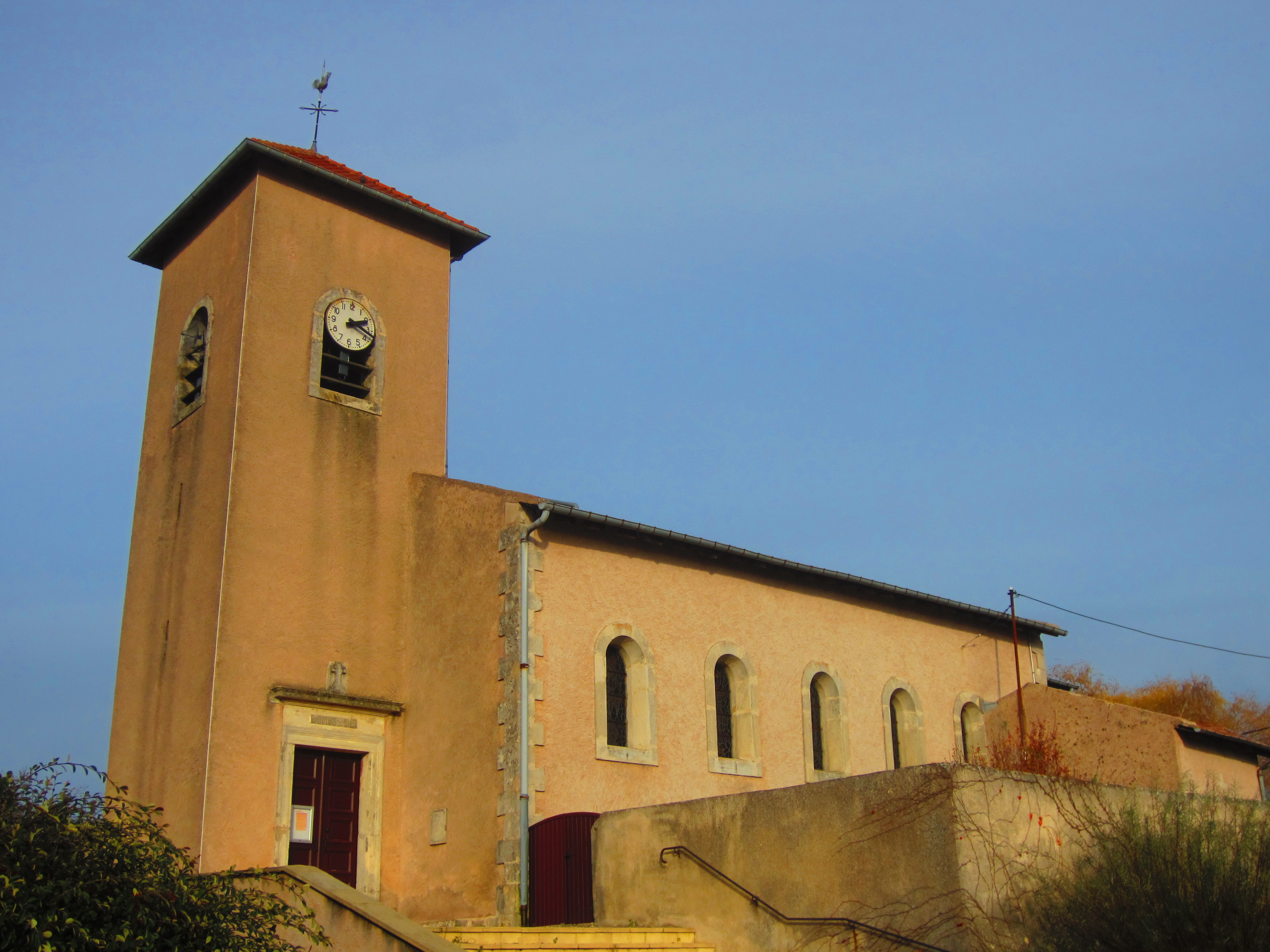
- The church in Landremont

- Coat of arms
- Location of Landremont
- Location within France Location within Grand Est
- Coordinates: 48°51′01″N 6°08′24″E
- Country: France
- Region: Grand Est
- Department: Meurthe-et-Moselle
- Arrondissement: Nancy
- Canton: Entre Seille et Meurthe
- Intercommunality: CC Bassin de Pont-à-Mousson

Government
  - Mayor (2020–2026): Jean-Marie Renard
- Area^{1}: 5.52 km^{2} (2.13 sq mi)
- Elevation: 310 m (1,020 ft)
- Highest elevation: 382 m (1,253 ft)
- Lowest elevation: 205 m (673 ft)
- Population (2023): 134
  - Density: 24.3/km^{2} (62.9/sq mi)
- Time zone: UTC+01:00 (CET)
  - Summer (DST): UTC+02:00 (CEST)
- INSEE/Postal code: 54294 /54380
- ^{1} French Land Register data, which excludes lakes, ponds, glaciers > 1 km^{2} (0.386 sq mi or 247 acres) and river estuaries.

Landremont (French pronunciation: [lɑ̃dʁəmɔ̃]) is a commune in the Meurthe-et-Moselle department in north-eastern France.

The commune is the birthplace of Amélie Rigard, who as Sister Julie kept running the hospice in Gerbéviller during the village's occupation and destruction by German troops in World War I. She was awarded the Legion of Honour.

== See also ==
- Communes of the Meurthe-et-Moselle department
