= Amélie Rigard =

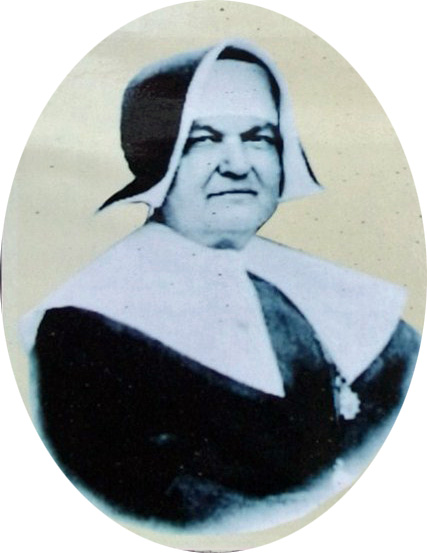
- Born: 16 February 1854; Landremont, Meurthe-et-Moselle, France
- Died: May 1925 (aged 70–71); Gerbéviller, Meurthe-et-Moselle, France
- Occupation: Nun

Amélie Rigard (16 February 1854 – May 1925) was a French nun. She is known for having kept a village hospice open to treat the wounded of both sides during the first months of World War I (1914–18).

== Early years ==
Amélie Rigard was born on 16 February 1854 in Landremont, Meurthe-et-Moselle. She became a nun of the Congregation of the Sisters of Saint-Charles of Nancy, taking the name of Sister Julie. This was a congregation of nursing sisters. She worked at a number of hospices, including that of Sainte-Ménéhould, and directed Saint-Matthieu at Nancy. At the time of the outbreak of World War I in August 1914 she had been managing the hospice of Gerbéviller, Meurthe-et-Moselle, for two years, looking after the sick and old people.

== German occupation of Gerbéviller ==
At the start of the war the Germans launched an advance towards the Charmes gap. They were held at the bridge over the Mortagne River at Gerbéviller on 24 August 1914 by the non-commissioned officer Chèvre, who held it throughout the day. The German artillery shelled the village, which had been abandoned by the civilian population. On 24 August 1914 the village was occupied by German soldiers, who burned the houses on the grounds that civilians had fired on them.

Sister Julie remained in her hospice, which was home to wounded soldiers and old men. After talking with the occupiers she ensured that the hospice was not burned and that none of the people under her protection were subjected to violence. German wounded arrived the next day. The German troops spent nine days destroying the village and shooting all the French they found. 21 hostages were arrested including the priest, who was accused of hiding civilians in the bell tower to shoot Germans. The church was burned down. The fighting continued until 10 September 1914. The hospice was one of the few buildings that were not totally destroyed, although repairs were needed to protect the sick from the bad weather.

== Aftermath ==
The delay gave General Castelnau time to prepare his counter-offensive on Rozelieures, the first French victory of the war. Sister Julie was cited in an Army order. President Raymond Poincaré visited Gerbéviller on 29 November 1914. On 2 December he spontaneously awarded "the nurse of the hospital-ambulance of Gerbéviller" the Legion of Honour. She was confirmed as a knight of the Legion of Honour by decree of 9 January 1915. Sister Julie was given much publicity in journals, with photographs and postcards. For example, one postcard depicted her preventing a German soldier from killing a wounded man. In the picture she has been made to look young and pretty. After the war she remained at the hospice until her death in May 1925, aged 71.

== Sources ==
- Bernard, Laurence (ed.), "SŒUR JULIE 1854 - 1925" (PDF), 14/18 Centennaire Les Femmes Celebres de la Grande Guerre (in French), Ville du Pecq
- Gardant, Alain, Les Cartes Postales Outils de Propagande et d'echanges Pendant la Grande Guerre (1914-1918) : Fiche Professeur (Niveau 3e-1ère L, Es, S, St2s, Stmg) (PDF), Archives départementales et patrimoine du Cher
- La chapelle de la maison de retraite Sœur-Julie à Gerbéviller (in French), Le petit patrimoine
- Madame Rigard (in French), Légion d'Honneur
