= Gerbéviller =

- Commune
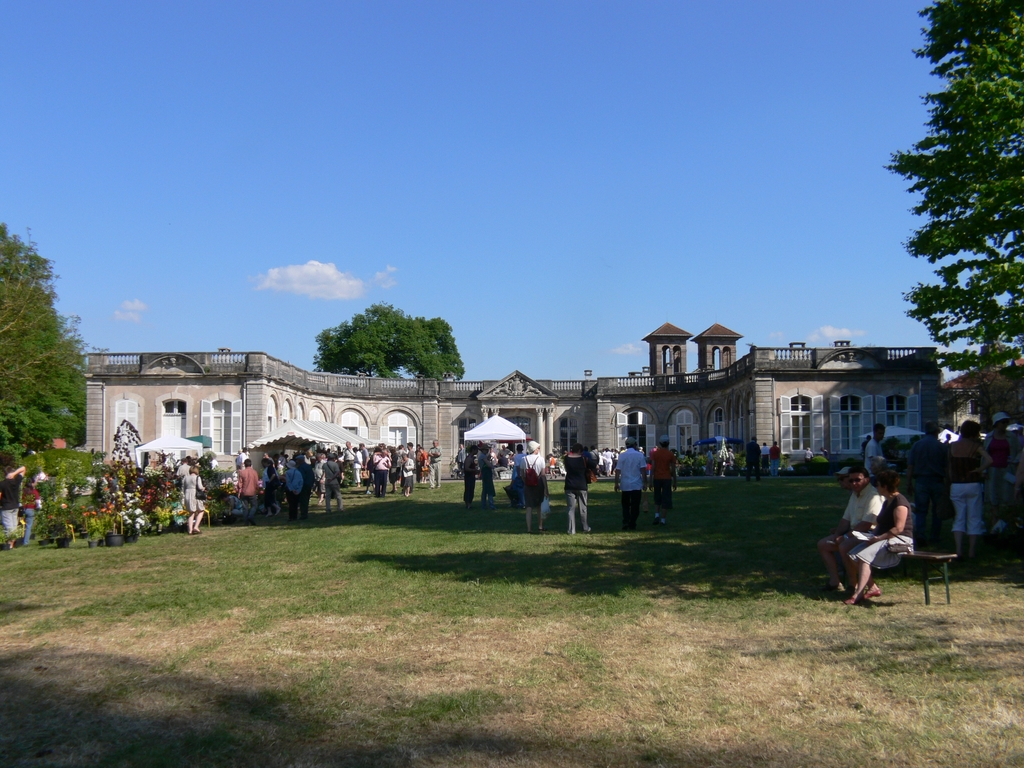
- The chateau in Gerbéviller

- Coat of arms
- Location of Gerbéviller
- Location within France Location within Grand Est
- Coordinates: 48°29′45″N 6°30′38″E
- Country: France
- Region: Grand Est
- Department: Meurthe-et-Moselle
- Arrondissement: Lunéville
- Canton: Lunéville-2
- Intercommunality: Meurthe, Mortagne, Moselle

Government
  - Mayor (2020–2026): Noël Marquis
- Area^{1}: 23.94 km^{2} (9.24 sq mi)
- Elevation: 238 m (781 ft)
- Highest elevation: 317 m (1,040 ft)
- Lowest elevation: 224 m (735 ft)
- Population (2023): 1,316
  - Density: 54.97/km^{2} (142.4/sq mi)
- Demonym: Gerbévillois
- Time zone: UTC+01:00 (CET)
  - Summer (DST): UTC+02:00 (CEST)
- INSEE/Postal code: 54222 /54830
- ^{1} French Land Register data, which excludes lakes, ponds, glaciers > 1 km^{2} (0.386 sq mi or 247 acres) and river estuaries.

Gerbéviller (French pronunciation: [ʒɛʁbevile]) is a commune in the Meurthe-et-Moselle department in north-eastern France. It is 33 km (as the crow flies) south east of Nancy and 73 km south-south-east of Metz. Culturally and historically, it is part of Lorraine.

== Geography ==
The town lies on the banks of the river Mortagne, which flows northwestward through the commune. The Château de Gerbéviller and its park lie to the west of the town. Both are designated historical monuments.

== History ==
Around August 24, 1914, the town was occupied by German troops in World War I. In retaliation for the stubborn defense of the town by the French 2e Bataillon de Chasseurs à Pied, and for the actions of French civilians who took up arms to assist in the defense, the German occupiers systematically burned and pillaged about 80% of the town and massacred its population.

The town is known for the action of Amélie Rigard. As Sister Julie, she kept running the hospice in Gerbéviller during the occupation. She was awarded the Legion of Honour in 1915.

== See also ==
- Communes of the Meurthe-et-Moselle department
- List of World War I Memorials and Cemeteries in Lorraine#Gerbéviller
