= List of World War I memorials and cemeteries in Lorraine =

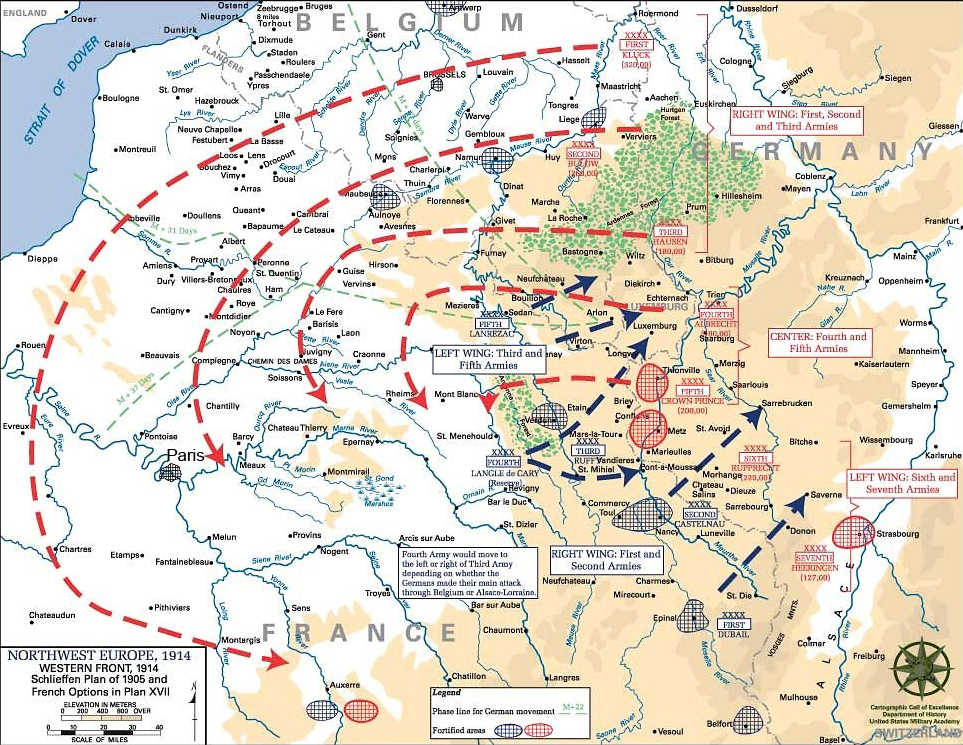
Map showing the German Von Schlieffen plan and the French plan XV11

Lorraine comprises the "départements" of Meurthe-et-Moselle, Meuse, Moselle and Vosges and the principal cities are Nancy, Bar-le-Duc, Metz and Épinal.

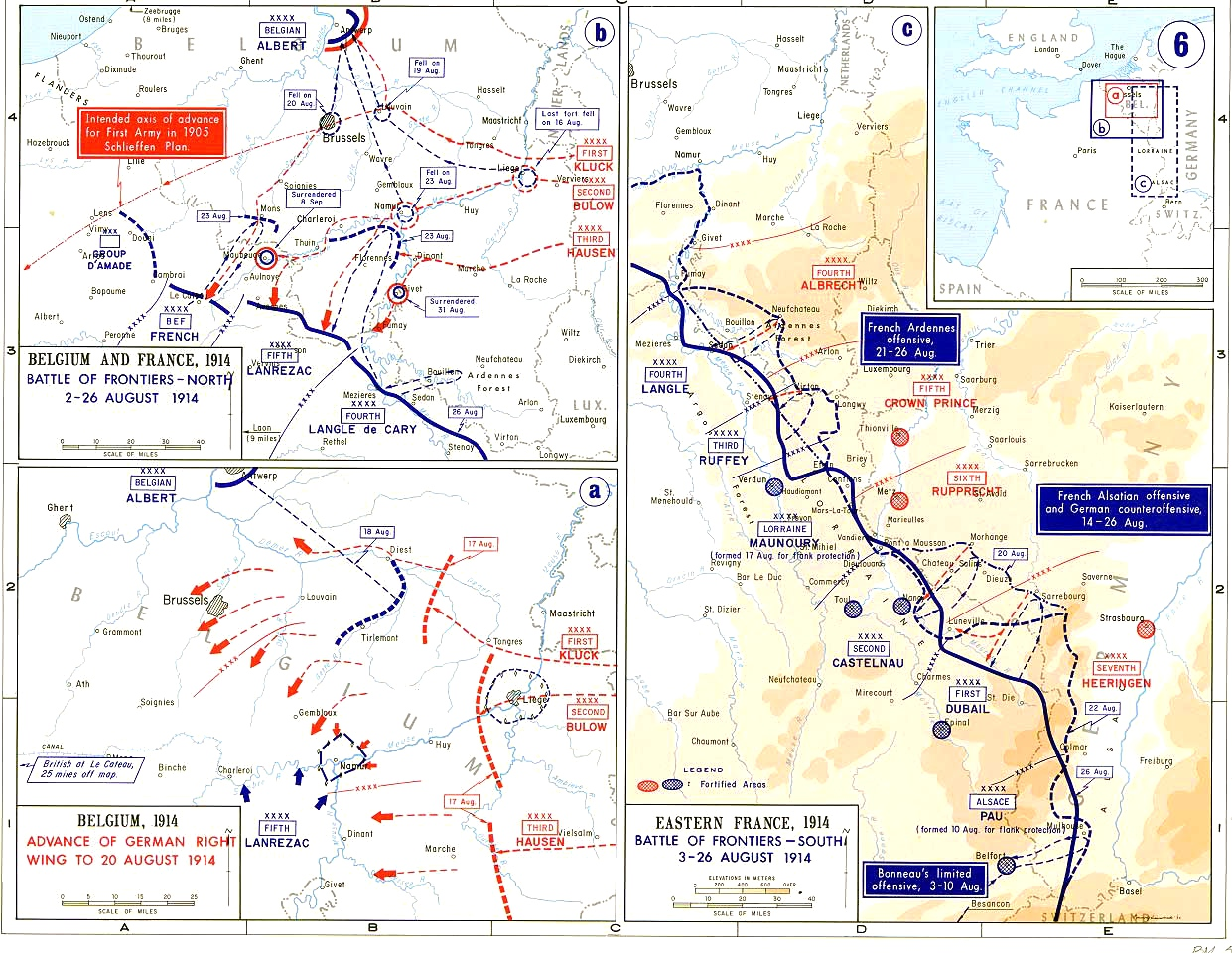
Map showing the Battles of Frontiers

== Background ==
Several battles occurred in Lorraine during World War I including the Battle of Lorraine, the Battle of the Trouée de Charmes, and the Battle of Grand Couronné. In addition, part of the Battle of the Frontiers was also fought in Lorraine.

== Memorials of Morhange, Moselle ==
=== Monument to the 15th Army Corps in Vergaville French Military Cemetery ===
In the French Military Cemetery at Vergaville is a monument dedicated to the 15th Army Corps. It depicts within an arch, a Lorraine woman holding in her arms a dying soldier. The monument was organised by public subscription on the initiative of the parents of some of the victims of the fighting in the Morhange area in August 1914. It is the work of the sculptor Petit and was designed by the architect Pialat from Uzès, whose son was killed at Dieuze. The inauguration took place on 22 August 1926. The cemetery at Vergaville, which is 4 kilometres north of Dieuze, contains the bodies of soldiers killed in the 19 to 20 August fighting.

=== Monument at Bidestroff ===
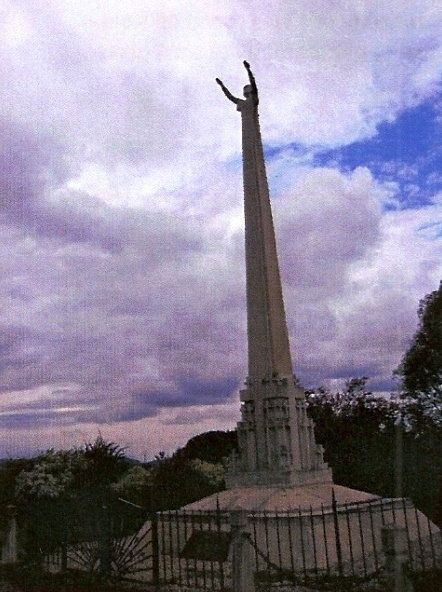
Monument at Bidestroff to the 15th French Army Corps

This memorial is dedicated to the men of the 15th Army Corps, part of the 29th Division, and to 1,204 French soldiers who lost their lives in the fighting at Morhange. The monument is located between Bidestroff and Vergaville. The men of the 15th mainly came from Provence and were the victims of a particularly heavy artillery bombardment, when caught on the high ground at Bidestroff, which left 1,204 dead on the battlefield.

It was in 1935 and on the initiative of the parish priest and the Bidestroff mayor, that a committee was set up which led to the monument being erected. Most of the funds were collected from veterans in Toulon, and the Strasbourg sculptor Valentin Jaeg was commissioned to carry out the sculptural work involved. The monument is 12.5 metres high and at the top is the figure of the Archangel St Michael who raises his arms to heaven. St Michael is the patron saint of Bidestroff.

At the base there are groups of crosses on each of the monument's four faces, each inscribed with the name of one of the units of the 15th Army Corps. These surround the Cross of Christ. The inscriptions on the monument read

"Au XVè corps 19 et 20 août 1914"

and

" Aux 1204 morts du cimetière militaire de Bidestroff, 1914-1925"

=== French Military Cemetery at Riche ===
The Riche French Military Cemetery lies midway between Morhange to the north and Riche to the south.

There is a monument located in the Riche Military Cemetery that remembers the men who fell fighting at Morhange. Riche lies just to the south of Morhange.

The inscription reads

"Aux Heros au Champ d'Honneur en Terre Lorraine 19-20th August, 1914 Morts pour La France"

At the side of the cemetery is a small chapel dating back to 1928. This has been roped off from the public owing to falling masonry. This is a pity as there are some magnificent stained glass windows in the chapel, of which four tell the history of the 20th Infantry Division.

The cemetery contains the remains of 2,574 French soldiers, with 1,088 individual graves and two ossuaries containing the remains of 1,486 men. 577 of these were not identified. Most of those buried were killed in the fighting at Morhange. This particular cemetery contains the grave of the son of General Joseph Curières de Castelnau, who was killed on 20 August 1914. There are also 158 Russian graves of a later war period and a Russian mass grave with an unknown number of Russian soldiers buried in it.

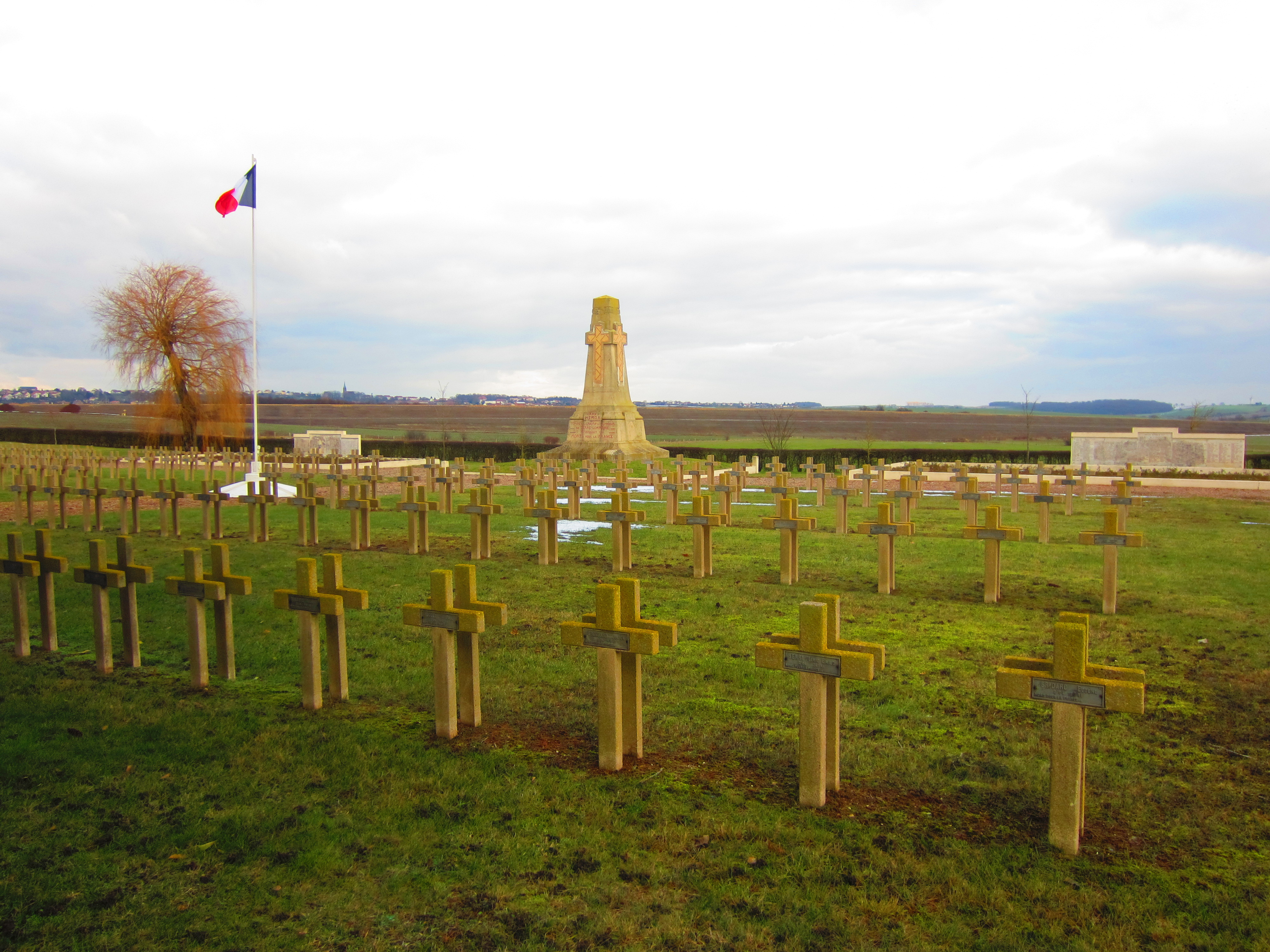
Cemetery at Riche with monument and two ossuaries visible to the rear

=== Memorial to the Battle of Morhange ===
This simple obelisk in granite remembers the soldiers who died in the battle of Morhange. Erected in the inter-war years, it was destroyed by the Germans during their occupation in the Second World War and rebuilt in 1964. Near to the obelisk there is a mounted map showing the field of battle so that one can visualise the events of the two days of the battle. The monument was inaugurated on 20 August 1921 and has a height of 10 metres. It carries the simple inscription

"Aux soldats français tombés glorieusement à la bataille de Morhange, les 19 et 20 août 1914"

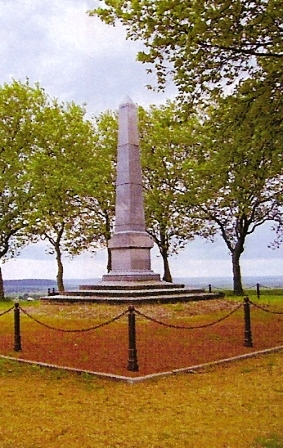
Memorial to the Battle of Morhange

=== Franco-German in Frémery ===
This comprises two ossuaries, one for German soldiers and the other for French soldiers. The German ossuary contains the human remains of 13 unknown soldiers while the French ossuary contains the remains of 176 French officers and soldiers of the 146th Infantry. All the men involved were killed nearby on 20 August 1914.

=== The German War Cemetery at Morhange ===
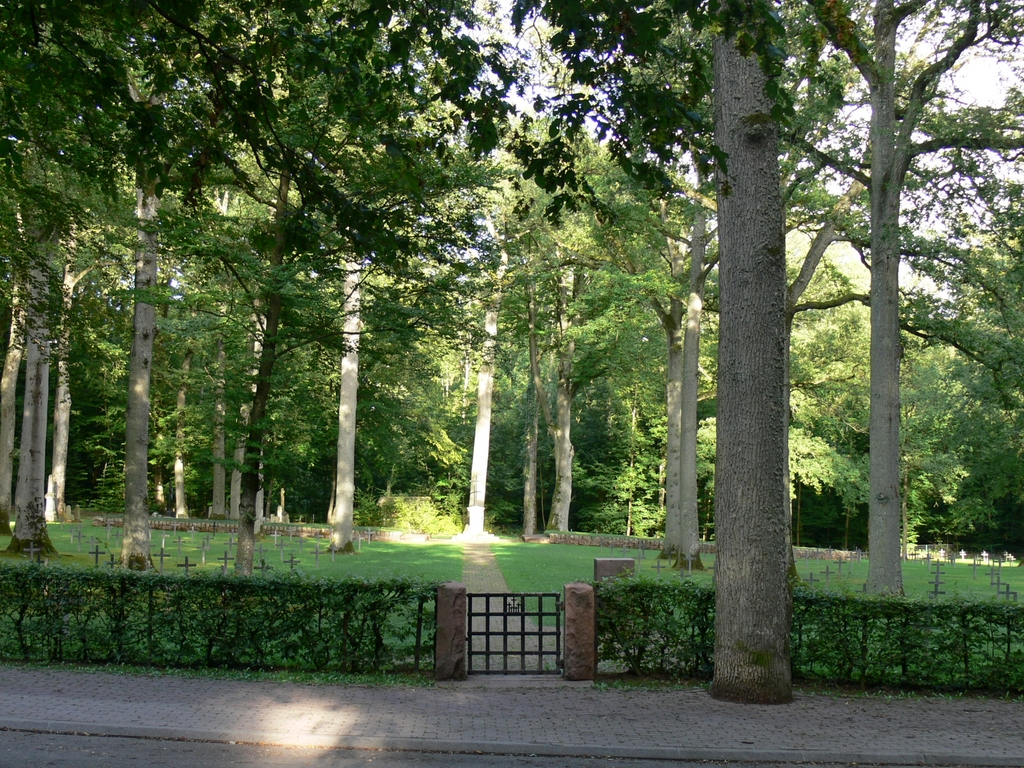
The German Cemetery at Morhange

This cemetery holds the remains of 4,753 German soldiers. 1,965 soldiers have individual graves and there are two ossuaries containing the remains of 2,788 soldiers, of whom 72 men are unknown. The German War Cemetery of Morhange was created by the German military administration in August 1914, during the Battle of Morhange as part of the existing German garrison cemetery. After the war, the French military authorities exhumed the French war dead and took them to their own cemetery and the bodies of German soldiers were collected from many other locations in the area and re-buried in this cemetery. The soldiers buried here were fighting in the area during the period of 20 to 23 August 1914 and early September. Later additions to the cemetery were the bodies of men who had fallen during the trench fighting in the years 1915-1918 or who died of their wounds in the nearby military hospitals. The majority of the soldiers buried here belonged to military units from Bavaria but there were also soldiers from Thuringia, Brandenburg, Alsace, Lorraine, Silesia, West Prussia, Hesse-Cassel, Mecklenburg and Schleswig-Holstein and Hanover and Brunswick.

In Lorraine there are also German Military Cemeteries at Bouillonville holding the remains of 1,368 soldiers, at Fey where 2,006 soldiers are buried with 500 unidentified. There is also a German cemetery at Thiaucourt with the remains of 11,685 soldiers. 2,980 of these are in an ossuary; 2,645 could not be identified. In Bertrimoutier the cemetery is a joint Franco-German one and holds the remains of 6,749 German soldiers and 950 French soldiers.

== Memorials and cemeteries in Moselle ==
=== The war memorial at Sarreguemines ===
The Sarreguemines monument stands in the Place du Général Sibille, facing the Palais de Justice and remembers the victims of the 1914-1918 war. It was inaugurated in 1933. The architect Henri Giraud designed the monument and the sculptural work was carried out by Jules Déchin. At a later stage a plaque was added acknowledging the victims of the Second World War. At the base is an allegorical representation of the town of Sarreguemines and at the summit is a bronze depicting the "Angel of Victory"

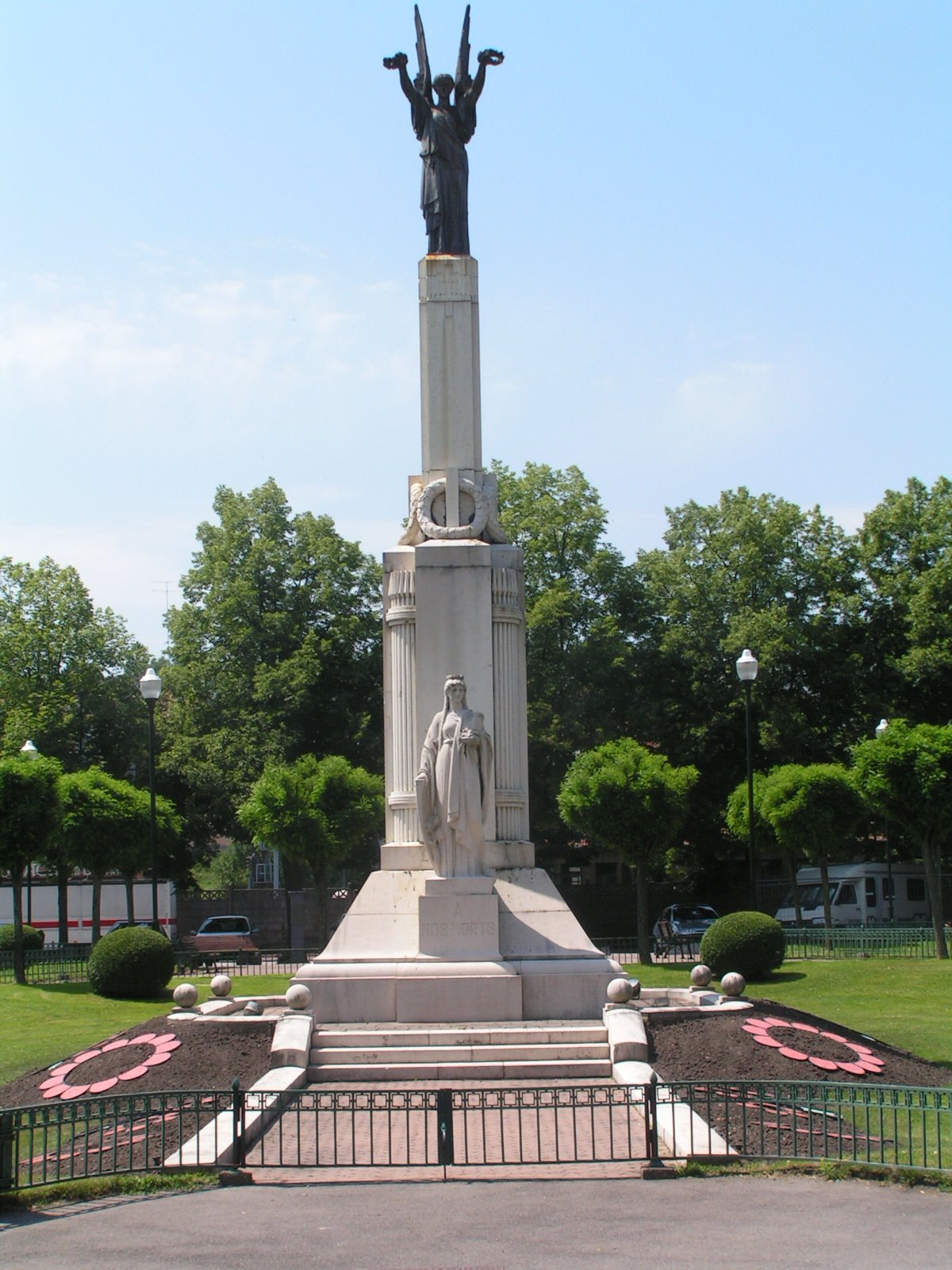
The war memorial at Sarreguemines

=== Lidrezing ===
The French War cemetery here holds the remains of 549 French soldiers from the 53rd, 58th, 69th and 79th French Infantry (the 15th, 16th and 20th Army Corps). These remains were from burial plots in Lidrezing, Zarbeling and Wuisse. There are 116 individual graves and two ossuaries. 203 of those who lie in these ossuaries were unidentified.

=== Conthil ===
The French War cemetery here was created in 1914 after the fighting of 20 August 1914. The cemetery contains an ossuary containing the remains of men from the 37th French Infantry regiment and there is also a monument dedicated to the 37th, inaugurated on 22 August 1922.

=== Cutting ===
The French Military cemetery here contains the grave of General Paul Émile Diou (1855–1914), who was a général de brigade.

The cemetery is called "L'Espérance" and was created in 1914 after the fighting at Morhange. Bodies were also gathered in from Loudrefing, Bénestroff, Dieuze, Guinzeling and Lostroff. There is a monument in the cemetery with sculpture by Charles Petit dedicated to the men of the 15th Army Corps killed in 1914 fighting at Dieuze. This was inaugurated 1 July 1934.

=== Dieuze ===
The French National cemetery holds a monument which remembers those French soldiers killed fighting at Dieuze on 19, 20 and 21 August 1914. This was inaugurated on 16 September 1934; the sculptural work is by Charles Petit, who was born in Dieuze.

There are also two ossuaries in the cemetery which contain the remains of both French and German soldiers who died fighting in the area and at the Dieuze military hospital.

There is also a monument dedicated to those Romanian prisoners of war sent to Alsace-Lorraine by the Germans in 1917 and 1918. 940 of these died in captivity and are buried at Dieuze. The inscription reads

"Aux soldats roumains 1916-1919. A la mémoire des 2344 prisonniers de guerre roumains morts dans les camps d'internement allemands en Alsace et en Lorraine en 1917 et 1918, à la mémoire des Alsaciens et des Lorrains qui les ont aidés à survivre. A la fière douceur de leur victoire unie, dormez au sol de France enfants de Roumanie"

- 2,344 men were to die in captivity and the inscription adds a thank you to the kindness of the people of Alsace and Lorraine.

Also in Dieuze there is a memorial to those French soldiers who were killed fighting in Romania. The sculptural work here is by Remus Botar Botarro and the monument was inaugurated on 9 November 1998.

== Monuments linked to the Battle of the Grande Couronné in Meurthe et Moselle ==
=== The Military Cemetery at Courbesseaux ===
Courbesseaux in Meurthe-et-Moselle was the scene of fighting on 25 August 1914, and was totally destroyed during the war. The military cemetery here holds the bodies of 2,679 soldiers, many of whom had died at Grand-Couronné. 1,703 of the dead could not be identified and their remains lie in 2 ossuaries. There are two monuments in the cemetery. One by Eugène Gatelet was erected in 1924 and shows a young peasant laying a wreath on the tomb of a soldier and in 1964 a simple monument was erected in memory of Edouard de Castelnau,

=== The memorial to the 11th Division at Léomont ===
The most south-easterly point of the Grande Couronné was at Léomont, where the ground rises to 377 metres giving excellent views over the surrounding countryside. It was an important hill to hold to protect Nancy. Fierce fighting took place here in 1914 between the French 11th Division and German units from Bavaria. Indeed, on the night of 25 to 26 August 1914 the area changed hands 8 times. The 11th Infantry Division, consisting of the 26th, 37th, 69th and 79th Infantry Regiments as well as gunners from the 8th and sappers from the 20th, was known as the "Iron Division". The citation on the monument reads

""A la 11ieme division. La Lorraine et La France reconnaissantes Ici La division de Fer Arreta la ruée allemande"

Apart from their efforts at Léomont, the 11th had fought at Lunéville and Friscati and had played an important role in protecting Nancy. The original monument, erected in 1922, was destroyed by the Germans in 1940 and reconstructed in 1950. It depicts a soldier mounting guard and protecting Nancy. The original sculpture was the work of Gaston Broquet and when the monument was rebuilt the sculptor, J. Sinapi, faithfully copied Broquet's original work.

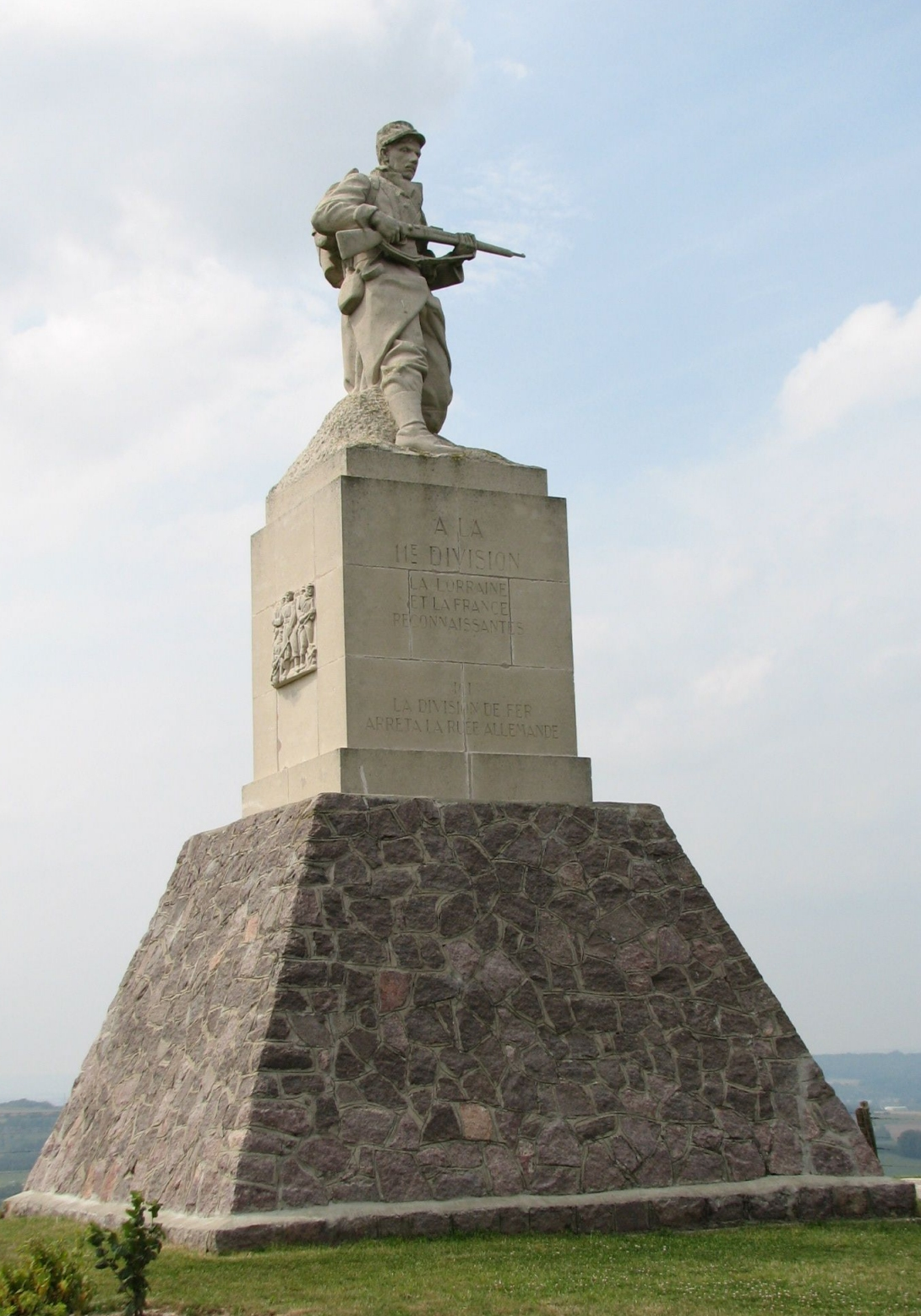
Memorial to the 11th Division at Léomont

=== War memorial at Samogneux ===
The war memorial here features a sculpture by Gaston Broquet which depicts a terrified young soldier trying to put his gas mask on. The work is entitled "L'alerte aux gaz"

Samogneux was involved in the Battle of Verdun and the French Infantry Regiments 112th, 173rd, 126th and 335th fought there.

=== The monument at Ste Geneviève ===
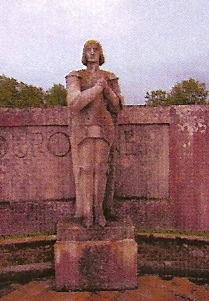
The monument at Ste Géneviève

Sainte-Geneviève is located in Meurthe-et-Moselle, south of Pont-a-Mousson and east of Nomeny and is in the area known as the Grand Couronné, where most of the 2nd French Army found themselves after the Battle of the Trouée. The latter had been the Germans' first attempt to break the French line after the encounters at Morhange and Sarrebourg, and they now decided to mount two major attacks on the French. One was aimed at Saint-Dié and resulted in the Battle of the Haute Meurthe, and the second was aimed at taking Nancy and led to the Battle of Grand Couronné. One of the monuments dedicated to the memory of this battle is at Ste Geneviève and is known as the "Monument du Grand Couronné". The monument stands on the heights of the Côte de Ste Geneviève and it was here that the French stationed their 59th Reserve Division. The monument is inscribed

"To the Defenders of the Grand Couronne August–September 1914 in memory of Louis Marin."

Marin was an influential local politician and the leader of the "National Republican Party" of Meurthe-et-Moselle, the President of the General Council of Nomeny and from 1934 to 1952 he was Chairman of the General Council of Meurthe-et-Moselle. The monument is somewhat worn and at each end of a curved wall are depictions of Joan of Arc and St Genevieve.

=== Croix des Carmes and the Bois-le-Prêtre ===
This monument is in the Bois-le-Prêtre near Montaumont, not far from Pont-à-Mousson in Meurthe-et-Moselle. Between September 1914 and July 1915 there was fierce and bloody fighting here between the French 73rd and 128th Infantry Division (known as the " Wolves of Bois-le-Prêtre") and the German 121st Infantry Division; a wooden cross was erected by the French soldiers and called the "Croix des Carmes". This cross was subsequently moved to the French War cemetery at Pétant for protection.

In 1923, the soldiers who had fought at Bois-le-Prêtre raised funds to replace the original cross with this monument. The sculptural work is by Emile Just Bachelet. His composition involves a large cross whose transverse is supported by two soldiers. One wears the uniform worn by the French in 1914 and the other the standard uniform worn at the war's end. The original cross has been bedded into the monument and Bachelet's maquette is held in the Musée de l'École de Nancy.

Raymond Poincaré attended the inauguration, which took place on 23 September 1923. The stained glass artist Jacques Grüber depicted the inauguration in 1924 on a window in the church of Saint-Gorgon in Fey-en-Haye nearby.

=== The Military Cemetery at Champenoux ===
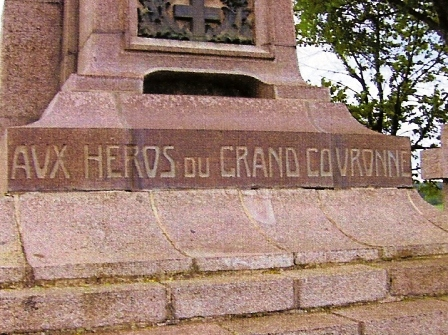
Inscription on Champenoux War Memorial

This cemetery at Champenoux in Meurthe-et-Moselle was created in 1919; it holds the remains of many of the victims of the Grand-Couronné battle. Three ossuaries hold 2,862 bodies, of whom 1,261 could not be identified. In the cemetery there is a granite monument with a bronze relief by Eugène Gatelet. It was erected by Souvenir Français in 1921 and is dedicated to "aux héros du Grand-Couronné". Gatelet also worked on the monument to General Édouard de Castelnau located in the French Military Cemetery at Courbesseaux

== Other monuments, memorials and cemeteries in Meurthe et Moselle ==
=== The French cemetery at Saulcy-sur-Meurthe ===
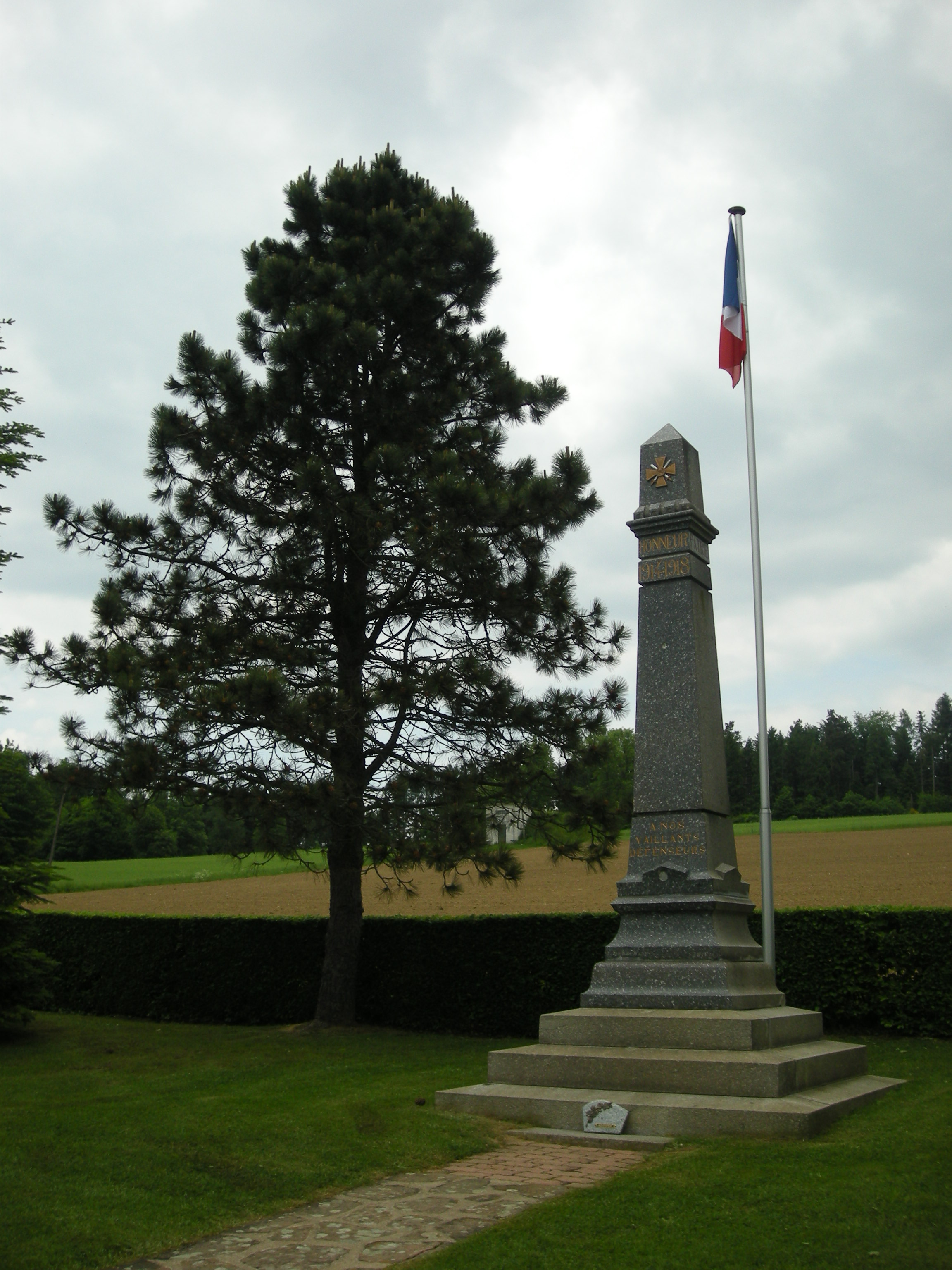
Monument in the French cemetery at Saulcy-sur-Meurthe

The cemetery was created in 1921 and brought in bodies originally and provisionally buried in graves in the Col du Bonhomme, the Col de la Schlucht, Gérardmer, Mandray, Le Valtin and la Croix-aux-Mines. The cemetery holds the remains of 2,565 French soldiers of whom 1,174 are buried in two ossuaries. It has been claimed that the body of the soldier buried in Paris in the tomb of the unknown soldier came from grave 1405 in the Saulcy-sur-Meurthe cemetery.

=== Nomeny ===
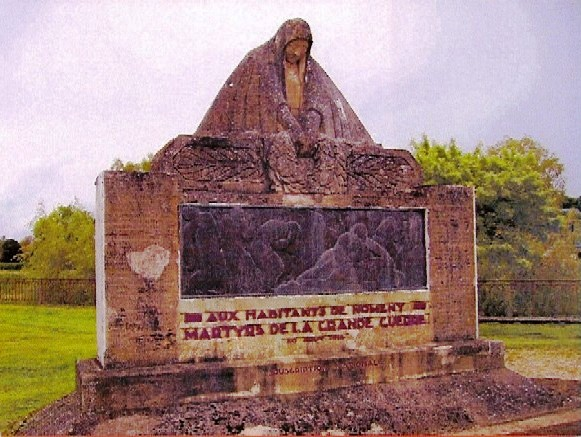
Monument at Nomeny

Nomeny was occupied by the Germans on 20 August 1914. The village was plundered, burned down and some 55 women, children, and elderly people slaughtered. The Governor of Metz, General von Oven had ordered the destruction of Nomeny as a reprisal for the French attack in front of Morhange. German soldiers had been fired on by so-called "Francs-tireurs." The names of 63 people who were killed are listed on the monument as well as 12 people who were badly injured. Similar events took place in Badonviller, Bréménil, Blâmont and Gerbéviller. Nomeny and nearby Brionne were to see fierce fighting on 20 August 1914 and there is a monument dedicated to the memory of the soldiers of the 59th Reserve and the 277th, 325th and 314th French Infantry who fell fighting to the north of the Grand Couronne and the River Seille and who as stated on the memorial

"Barrer La Route de Nancy à l'Envahisseur"

In Brionne there were it seems other more sinister events

"A Brionne fut arrêté L'Ennemi après L'Incendie et La Meurtre inqualifiable de 70 habitants de Nomeny"

=== The war memorial in the Cimetière Sud in Nancy ===
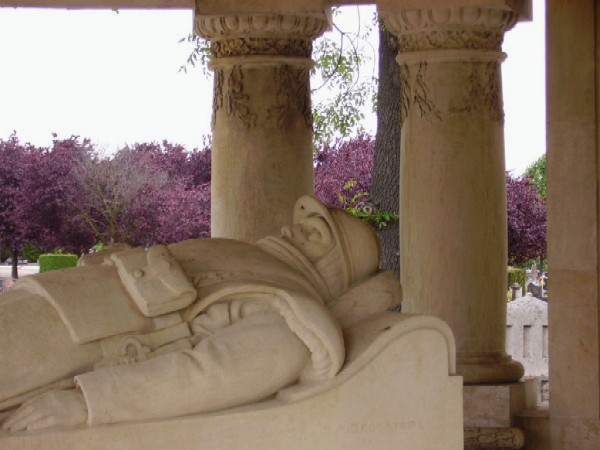
Monument in Nancy South Cemetery

The large cemetery located in the south of Nancy has a memorial dedicated to all those soldiers who fell in the 1914-1918 war. Nancy had been occupied by the Germans in the 1870-71 war but in August 1914, General Castelnau's troops managed to stem the German offensive and saved Nancy at the Grand Couronné encounter. Many French soldiers were wounded in this battle and were sent to the hospital at Nancy and those who did not survive are buried in this cemetery.

Underneath an elaborately carved granite canopy and supported by columns, is a sculpture of a reclining soldier which is reminiscent of the "Soldat du Droit" at Fleury-devant-Douaumont in the Meuse and around the canopy are inscribed "les frontières"; the names of the main areas of the conflict- "Yser, Artois, Marne, Somme, Champagne, Aisne, Verdun, Argonne and Grand Couronné". A photograph of the monument is shown here.

=== Monument in Nancy's Cimetière Sud to the civilians of Nancy ===
During the German artillery shellings mentioned above, many civilians lost their lives and they are remembered in a monument in the Cimetière Sud. Their graves encircle a simple square concrete memorial which has their names engraved on it. A small plaque has been added to remember the dead of the 1939-1945 war when Nancy was occupied by the Germans. A photograph is shown below.

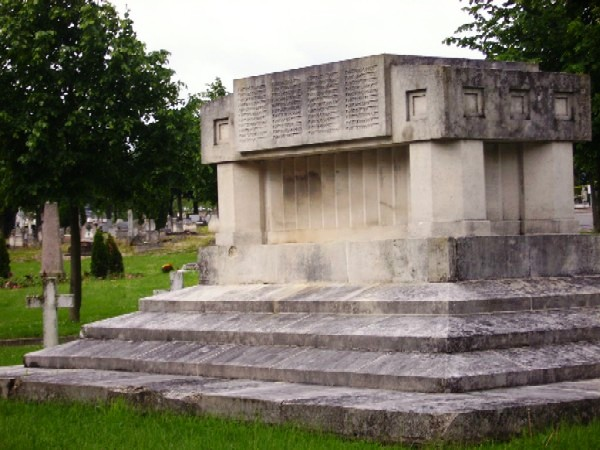
Monument to civilians of Nancy killed 1914-1918

The main inscription reads

"Aux Victimes Civiles de la guerre 1914-1918"

=== Memorial to the 37th Infantry Regiment at Cimetière Sud in Nancy ===
In the Nancy Cimetière Sud there are many regimental memorials including an obelisk dedicated to the casualties of the 37th Infantry Regiment. At the base is this sculpture of a grieving woman.

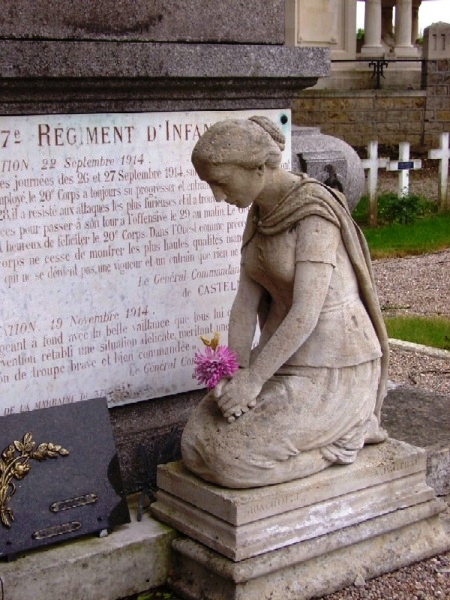
Memorial to 37th French Infantry

Other memorials in the cemetery are dedicated to the 5th Regiment of Hussars, the 69th French Infantry, the 79th French Infantry and the 8th Regiment of Artillery.

=== War memorial at Dombasle sur Meurthe ===
At Dombasle sur Meurthe in Meurthe-et-Moselle is this poignant war memorial. A soldier is depicted telling the children of Dombasle sur Meurthe the story of the 1914-1918 war.

There is also a monument in the town dedicated to the soldiers of the 20th Company of the 212th French Infantry who were killed in the fighting on 23 August 1914, when the Germans were prevented from occupying the town. They were led by a Colonel Brau. The inscription reads

"Le Colonel Brau, Défenseur de Dombasle, a évité à la ville d'être occupée par l'ennemi le 23 août 1914 grâce à son courage et à celui des vaillants soldats de la 20e Compagnie du 212e Régiment d'Infanterie"

This monument is situated at the crossing of the Rue du Colonel Brau and La Place du Souvenir Français.

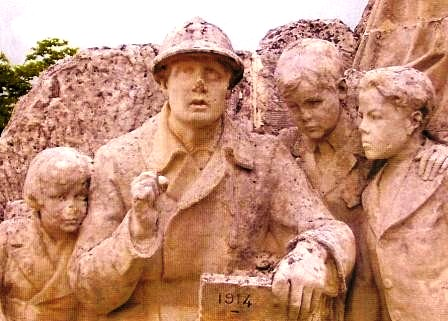
War memorial at Dombasle sur Meurthe. A Frenchman tells children of the Great War.

=== Gerbéviller ===
There is a monument in Gerbéviller in Meurthe-et-Moselle dedicated to the 74th Infantry. The inscription reads

"A la mémoire des Héros de la 74e D.I.R., Défenseurs de Gerbéviller : 36e R.I.C. - (222e - 223e - 230e - 299e - 333e Régiments de Réserve) - 27/08/1914 - 02/09/1914"

This monument stands alongside the road skirting the two war cemeteries in Gerbéviller, one French and one German.

The war memorial at Gerbéviller is dedicated in particular to the chasseurs of the 2nd Brigade commanded by an adjutant called Chèvre, who held a Bavarian brigade at bay. The sculptural work is by Émile Just Bachelet.

The French war cemetery was created in 1920 and holds the remains of many of the soldiers who died in the fighting at the battle of the Trouée des Charmes in August 1914. Total burials are 2,164.

The German war cemetery holds the remains of 5,462 soldiers.

=== The war memorial at Lunéville ===
Originally dedicated to the victims of the 1914-1918 war, this memorial was later changed to include the dead of the 1939-1945 conflict and now bears more than 1,400 names. It was designed by the architects André Gutton et G. Grange and the sculptural work was by Claude Grange. The memorial was inaugurated on 19 June 1927 and comprises two large stone pylons with a woman on horseback at the top of each pylon. The depiction of horses reflects the fact that many cavalry units were garrisoned here at the start of the war including the 2nd Cavalry Division.

=== The Lantern of Death in the French War cemetery at Rozelieures ===
There is a depiction of the "Lantern of Death" in the cemetery at Rozelieures which remembers the dead of the Battle of Rozelieures August–September 1914.

The inscription lists all the French units involved

"On pris part à la Bataille : 2e, 6e 10e Division de Cavalerie 2, 4, 8, 10, 12, 14, 15, 19, 20 et 31e Dragons, 13, 17 et 18e Chasseurs à Cheval, 7 et 10e Cuirs. Le Hussards 2, 6 et 10e D.C. Groupe cyclistes, Groupe d'Artillerie 1, 48e R.A. 2, 70e B.C.P.Infanterie: 10, 13, 15, 23, 27, 53, 56, 80, 81, 85, 95, 98, 124, 142, 143, 210, 230, 233, 322 et 333e R.I."

=== The "Fontaine de la République" memorial on the Le Chapolette peak ===
This drinking fountain at Le Chapolette was created by some soldiers of the 338th French Infantry themselves and is inscribed

"En souvenir des soldats corses et méridionaux, morts ici, en combattant pour une juste cause – souvenez-vous que sous ce sol reposent à jamais des combattants français et allemands, morts dans une impitoyable guerre de mines. Les châtaigniers qui prospèrent sur ce sol sont un souvenir de leur passage et de leurs beaux pays"

=== The monument to the 38th and 86th French Infantry at Baccarat ===
The 86th Infantry Regiment was a regiment from Velay in the Haute-Loire. They earned much glory during the war and particularly during the battle of Baccarat on 25 August 1914. Baccarat is crossed by the River Meurthe which runs through it from south to north and in the town centre is an important bridge which carries the road that connects Rambervillers to Sarrebourg. It was here that the 86th fought with great bravery and lost 90 men with many more injured. In 1927, the people of Baccarat had a monument to the soldiers of the 86th erected in the form of a large white cross.

The inscription on the monument, which also remembers the soldiers of the 38th French Infantry, reads

"A la mémoire des officiers, sous officiers, caporaux et soldats des 38e et 86e R.I., tombés glorieusement en combattant dans nos rues et dans nos champs, le 25 août 1914, qui trouvèrent ici une sépulture provisoire. Le Souvenir Français, 1927".

. The monument is situated where the Rue des Trois fontaine crosses the Rue de Saint-Christophe.

=== The war memorial at Badonviller ===
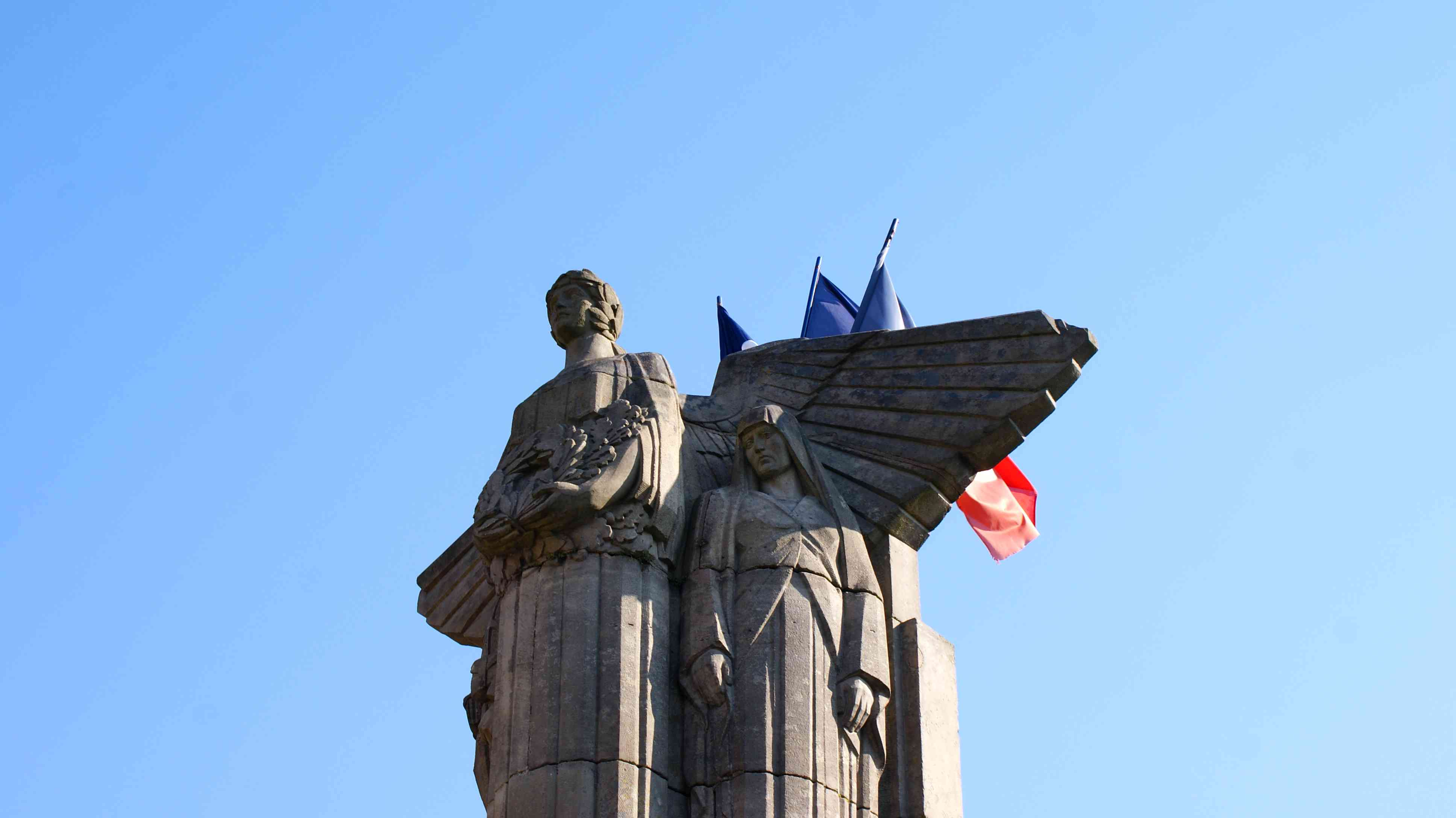
Bachelet's sculpture at Badonviller

This war memorial is near to the church of Saint-Martin in Badonviller and has at its summit a sculpture which features three figures. In the centre is a depiction of a grieving woman, while to her left is a soldier and to her right another woman in tears. The soldier remembers all those who fought in the area, while the woman in tears recalls the city's suffering during the artillery bombardments of 1914. The monument was designed by the Nancy architect H. Antoine and the sculptural work was by the Parisian sculptor Emile Just Bachelet.

=== Monument to the 358th French Infantry ===
In Badonviller's war cemetery there is a monument dedicated to the 1,564 men of the 358th French Infantry.

The inscription reads

"Monument élevé à la mémoire de nos chers camarades du 358e R.I. Morts pour la France au cours de la Grande Guerre. Hommage fraternel des anciens combattants du 358e R.I. et de leurs amis. 14 juillet 1924"

=== The French War Cemetery at Vitrimont-Friscati ===
This cemetery lies to the east of Vitrimont in an area known as the Mouton Noir. It was created in 1918 by the dedicated efforts of Marie-Marguerite Wibrotte, who organised the collection of the bodies of 3,751 soldiers who had died fighting at Vitrimont, as well as at Léomont, Crévic and Bonviller between August and September 1914, the days of the fighting between Ruprecht's 6th German Army and Castelnau's 2nd French Army. 1,683 of these soldiers could not be identified and their remains were put into 3 ossuaries. There is also a chapel in the cemetery, again organised by Miss Wibrotte, as a refuge for those visiting the cemetery and this has frescos painted by Burguin, an artist from Lunéville. A large calvary dominates the cemetery and in 1927 a monument was added depicting a soldier standing under a triumphal arch, this by the sculptor Cochinaire. Another monument was added in 1968 dedicated to the memory of Marshal Lyautey. It comprises three arches brought from his original memorial in Rabat, Morocco.

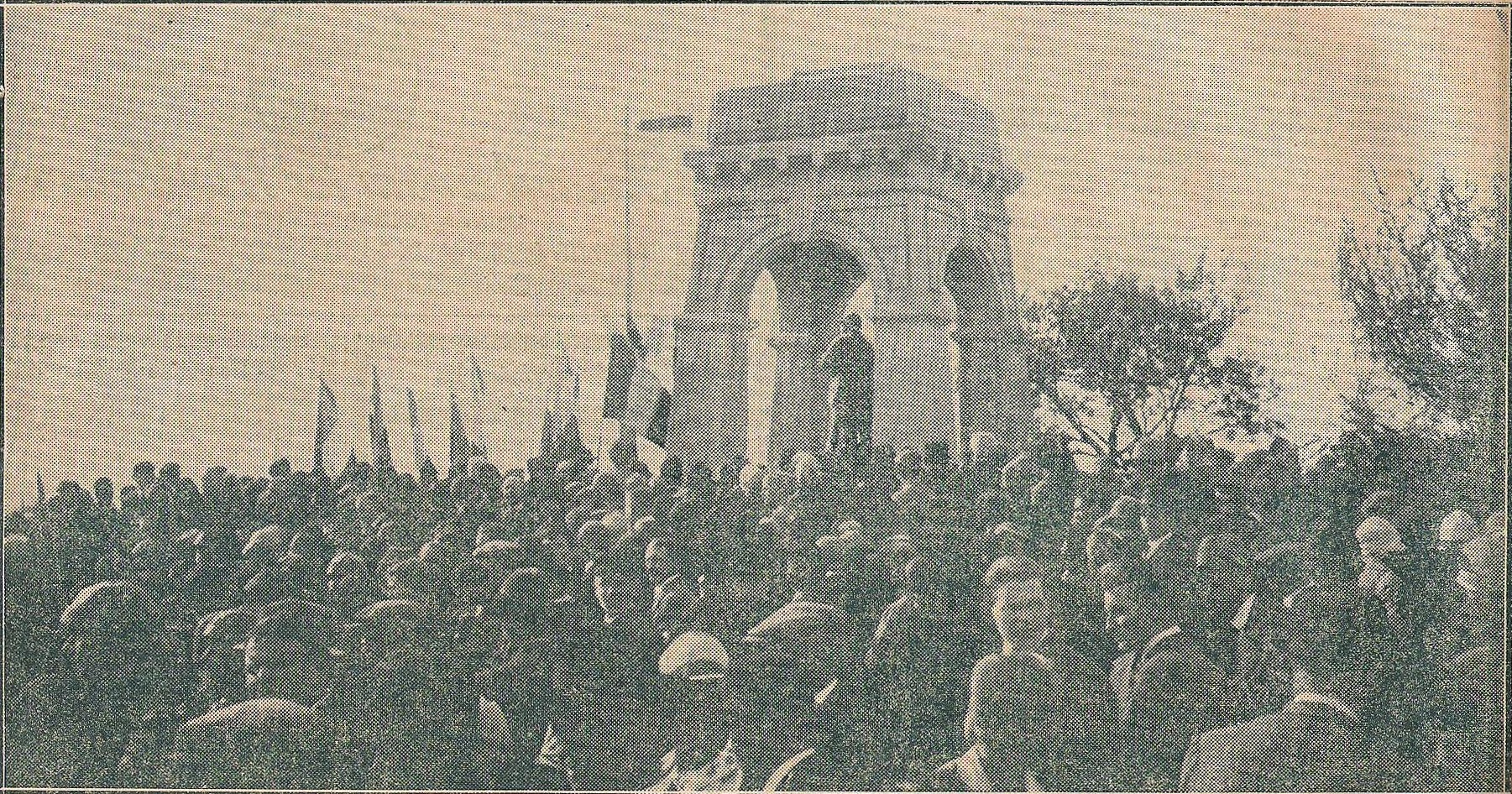
The inauguration of Cochinaire's Triumphal Arch

== Monuments and cemeteries in the Vosges ==
=== Memorial to the 363rd French Infantry in Badonviller's French War Cemetery ===
In the French war cemetery at Badonviller there is a monument which remembers the efforts of the 363rd French Infantry at La Chapelotte.

The cemetery contains the remains of 2,653 Frenchmen, of whom 1,209 lie in two ossuaries. The bodies here were moved from smaller burial plots at Angomont, Badonviller, Baccarat, Montigny, Neufmaisons, Pierre-Percée and Saint-Maurice.

=== The Mountain pass at La Chapelotte ===
This pass has a height of 447 metres and stands between the Donon and the Royon l'Etape and was strategically important linking the plain of Lorraine and the Vosges Massif. Throughout the war there were fierce encounters between the French and Germans. Many of the battles were fought underground and there was much tunneling and the use of explosive mines set off under the opposition's trenches.

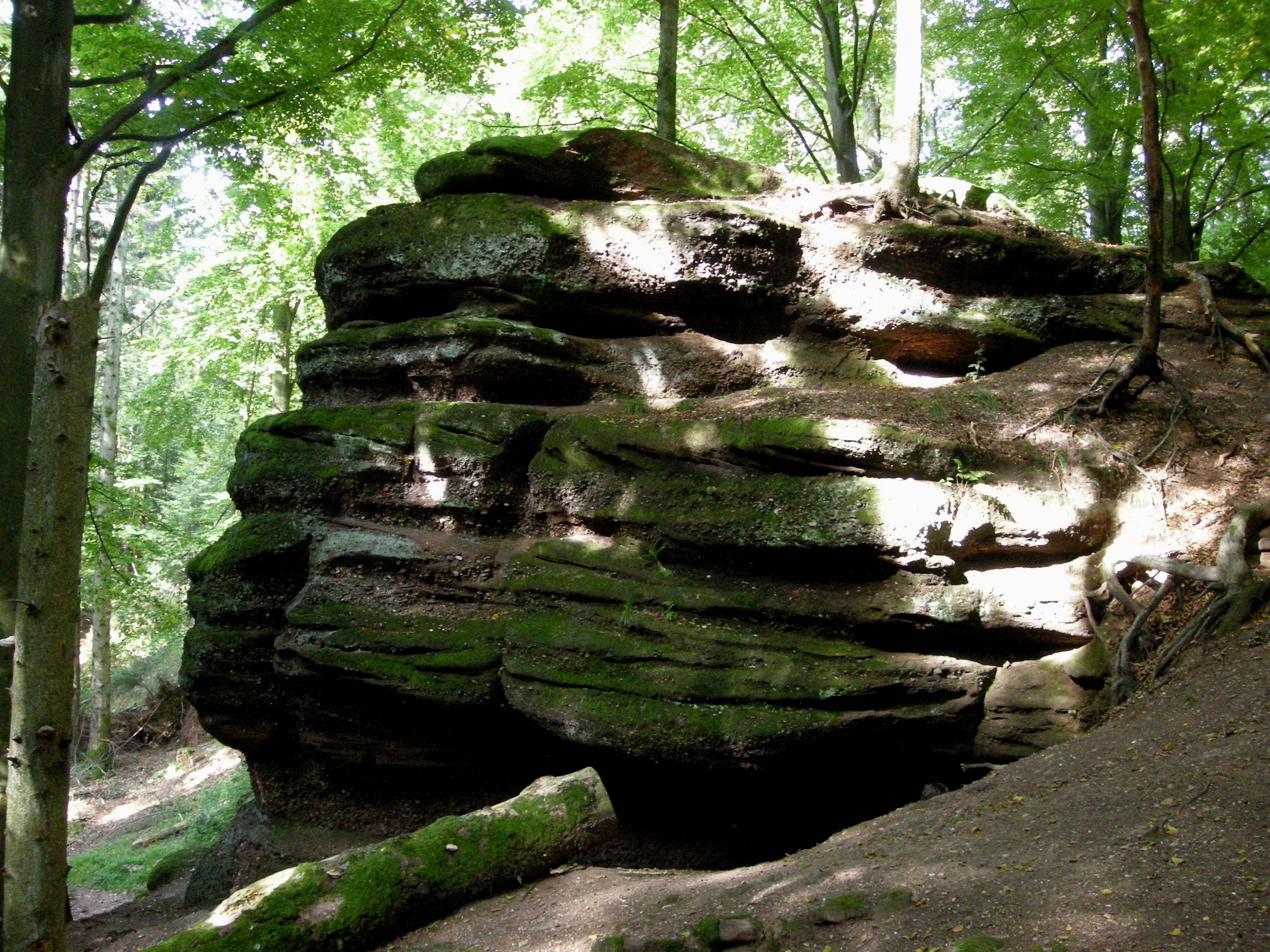
Soldiers grotto at La Chapelotte

There is a fountain here erected by the soldiers of the 338th Infantry as mentioned above. The area had many caves; one of these is known as the "Grotte des Poilus" and was used as a first-aid post by the soldiers of the 43rd Territorial Infantry. At the top of the mountain there is a monument which reads

"Aux Morts Glorieux du 363e R.I."

=== The Col de la Chipotte ===
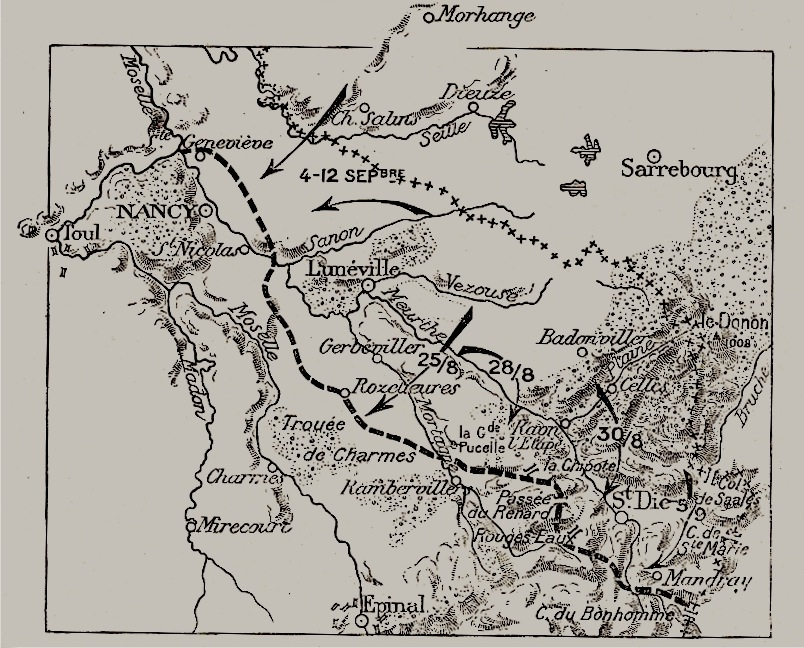

This pass is in the Vosges east of Saint-Dié and west of Rambervillers. There was fierce fighting here from 25 to 11 September, with the area changing hands several times. In the Chipotte French War cemetery there is a monument to the men of the 86th Brigade and another to the 2nd Brigade Coloniale. The cemetery has 1,006 individual graves and two ossuaries holding the remains of 1,899 soldiers whose remains could not be identified. Incidentally, French soldiers called la Chipotte "Le Trou de l 'Enfer" (The Hell Hole).

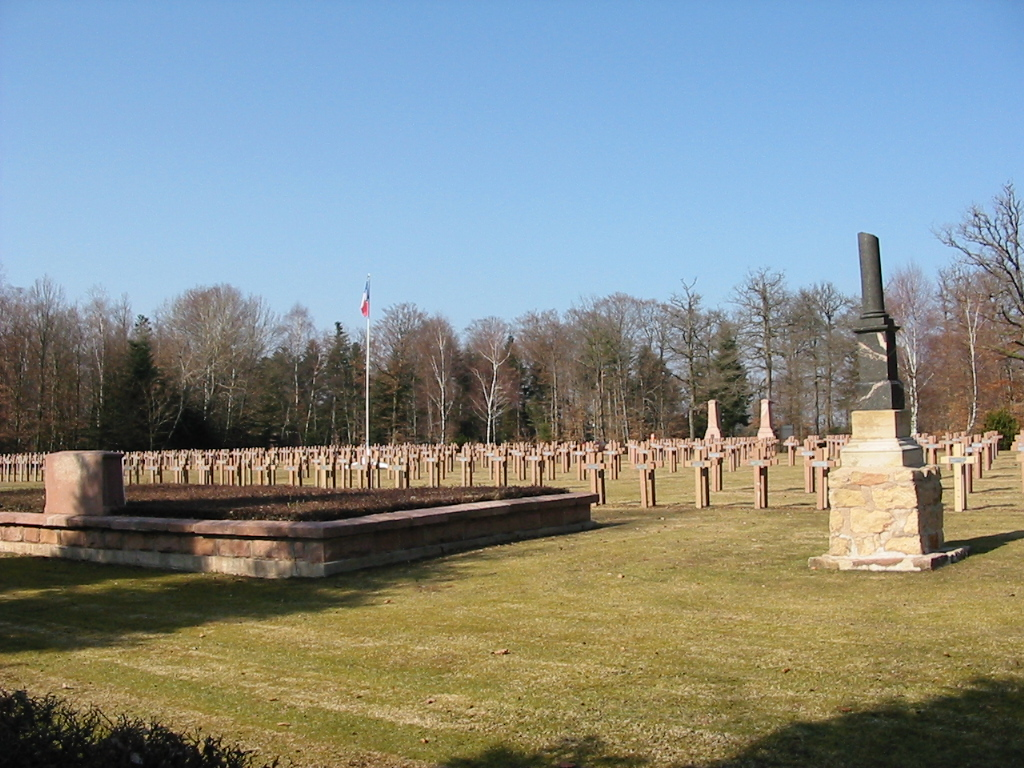
French War cemetery at Chipotte

=== "Pour la France" a bas-relief at the French Cemetery at Pierre-Percée ===
This monument with a bas-relief by Antoine Sartorio was erected in 1915 and is dedicated to all the combatants who fought at La Chapelotte and in particular the 363rd Infantry Regiment.

The monument bears the inscription

"La Chapelotte 1914-1918. En ces lieux la guerre avait fait d'une magnifique forêt une terre chaotique. La nature en paix a repris ses droits et cicatrise ses plaies. Mais reste le souvenir des quelques 2 000 combattants français tombés ici pour notre indépendance"

=== The War Memorial at Raon-l'Etape ===
The war memorial here features a bronze by Gaston Broquet entitled "La Patrouille".

The area around Raon-l'Etape saw much action in the period August/September 1914 and this particularly involved the 21st battalion of the "chasseurs à pied"

The war memorial here features a sculpture by Gaston Broquet and it is recorded that the interior of the war memorial contains an urn with a sample of soil of the battlefield of Douaumont near Verdun. Broquet had had experience of the war having served in the 94th French Infantry. Broquet's work can be seen in the depiction of the wounded Sergeant Maginot in the Maginot memorial near Fort de Souville and the horrified Poilu with gasmask of Samogneux.

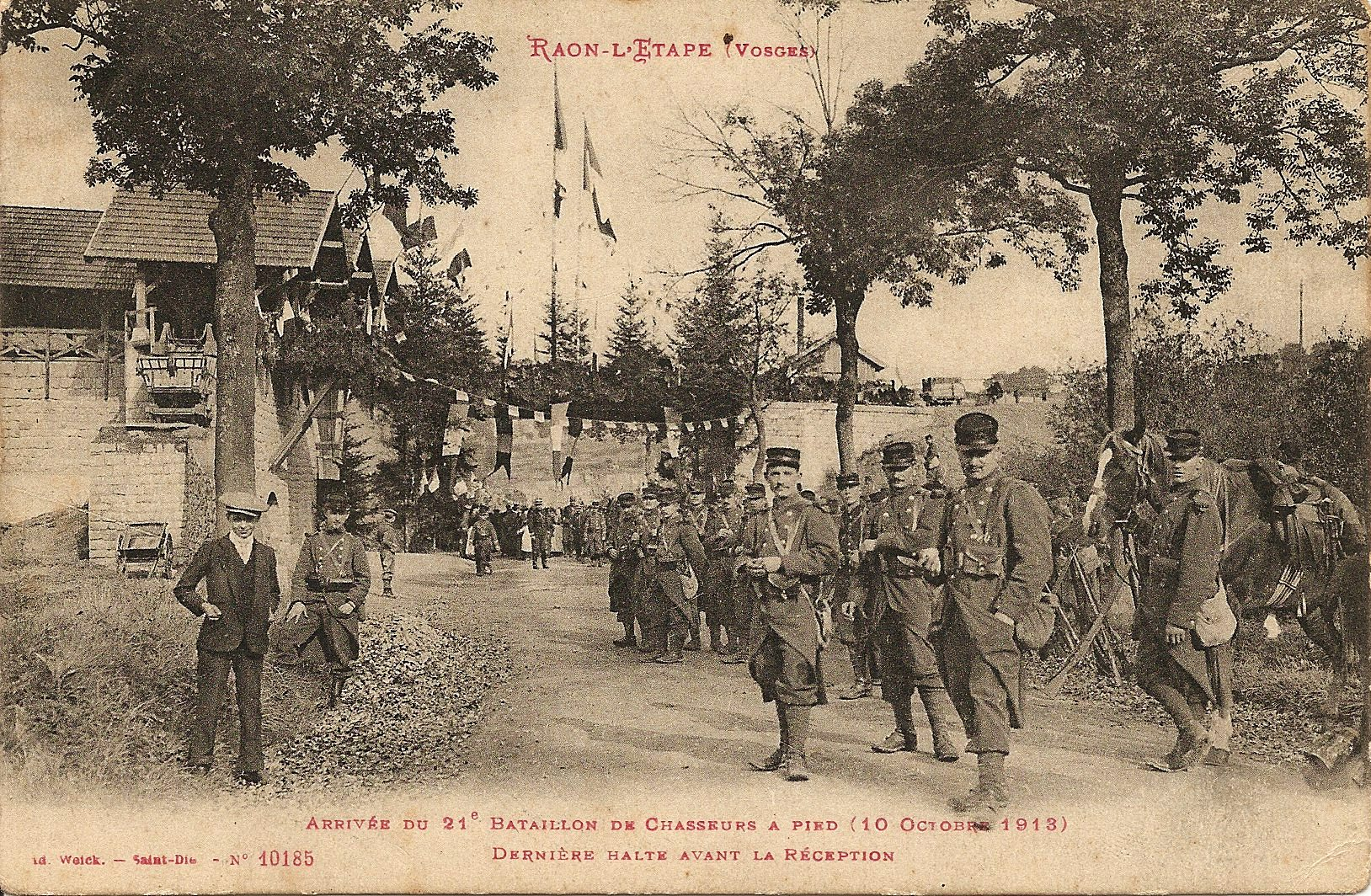
The 21st battalion arrive at Raon-l'Etape

=== Senones ===
Senones lies north of Saint-Dié-des-Vosges and east of Raon-l'Étape.

There is a German War cemetery or Kriegsgräberstätte at Senones which contains 1,528 German burials. Of the 1,528 soldiers 784 are buried in a grave, and 22 individual soldiers of them are unknown. The mass grave contains the remains of 744 killed soldiers; only 348 of them are known by their name. The "Schlacht in Lothringen" or the "Battle of Lorraine" from 25 to 28 August 1914, the defensive fighting in the winter 1914–1915, the trench warfare of 1915, and the war in late 1918 increased the number of dead in this sector of the front. Soldiers buried here came from garrisons in Bavaria, Baden, Hessen, Hanover, Brunswick, Ostfriesland, Wurttemberg, Westphalia, Thuringia, Brandenburg, Silesia and the Rhineland. On 25 August 1914, the Germans entered Senones on their march on St. Dié des Vosges and after the battle at la Chipotte and on 12 September 1914, units of the 30th Bavarian Reserve Division passing the defenceless town of Senones while retreating to return in the evening to occupy the town.

There is also a French War cemetery at Senones which contains the graves of 795 French Soldiers, including colonial soldiers. 372 of these soldiers are buried in 2 ossuaries. There are also 6 Poles, 11 Romanians and 6 Russians buried in the cemetery. Soldiers buried here were brought in from the battlefields in the area around Bois du Palon, Bois "Y", la Scierie de Malfosse, la Chapelle de la Halte, the nearby Mère Henry and the Haute-Forain.

=== Saint-Dié-des-Vosges ===
The original war memorial at Saint-Dié-des-Vosges was a most elaborate one with a French soldier at the top crushing the German Imperial eagle, the figure of Déodat, the founder of the town, and General Haxo and other figures, but this was demolished by the Germans during the occupation in the Second World War as they wanted to melt down the bronze for munitions manufacture. Symbolically the town has left just the base of that monument standing as a reminder of the suffering which the town endured from 1940 to 1944, in particular the town's burning in 1944.

There is a French War cemetery at Saint-Dié-des-Vosges called "Les Tiges" which contains the remains of 2,608 French soldiers of which 1,182 could not be identified and lie in two ossuaries. The men buried here were brought in from Ravin, la Côte, Mailleufaing, La-Salle, Saint-Rémy and Nompatélize.

Another memorial to those who died fighting in 1914-1918 stands in the cemetery. See photograph below.

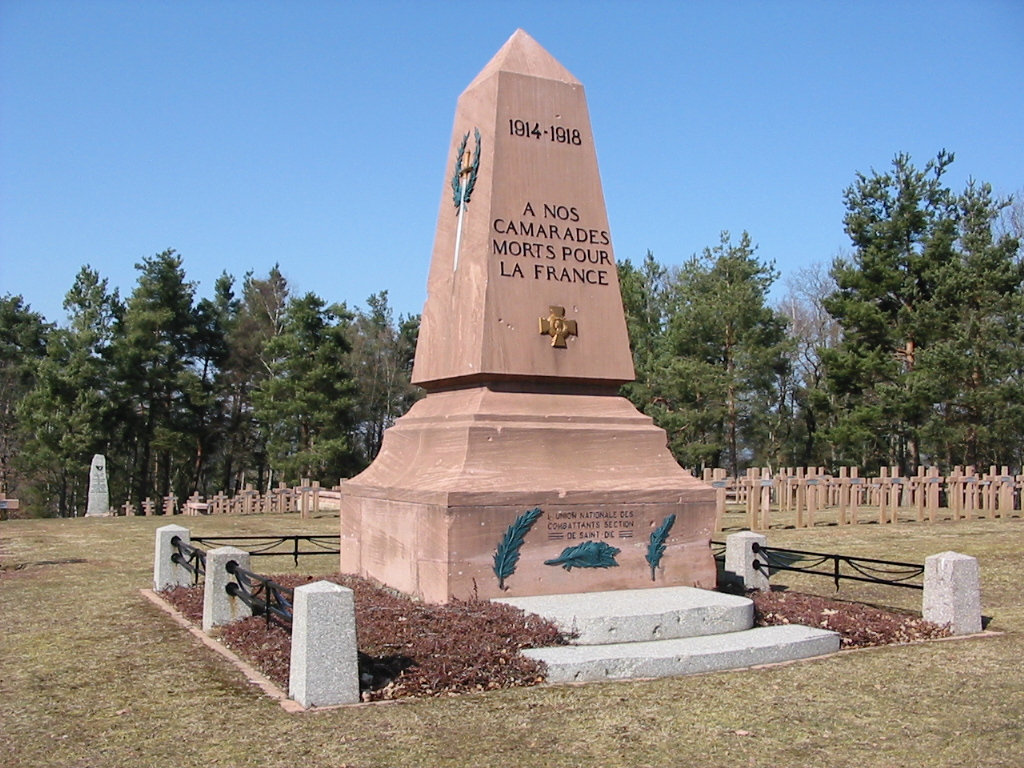
War Memorial in Saint-Dié-des-Vosges French War cemetery

=== Ban-de-Sapt ===
The 1914-1918 war memorial in this Vosges town stands in front of the town hall and a sculpture of a female figure representing the "Republic" is by Emile Just Bachelet. The words "Courage – Tenacité – Audace – Endurance" are inscribed on the memorial's base.

=== The French War cemetery at La Fontenelles ===
Ban-de-Sapt or Launois lies north of St Die des Vosges and between La Grande Fosse and the Petite Fosse. There is a hill known as "La Fontenelles" near to Ban-de-Sapt which was strategically important in 1914, and on 14 September the 1st French Army took the area. Thereafter the Germans made every effort to retake it and as time went on it became a trench area where many tunnels were excavated and underground explosives detonated. The front line eventually ran along the flanks of the hill. In 1915, the fighting was more intense and the French were able to gain some ground. In the French War cemetery of "La Fontenelle" at Ban-de-Sapt, there is a monument remembering those killed in the 1915 fighting which includes the depiction of a Marianne and a French soldier. See photograph above. This cemetery contains the remains of 1,384 Frenchmen of whom 424 lie in an ossuary. It was established in 1925.

=== Bertrimoutier ===
The French War cemetery here holds bodies brought in from La Chapelle Sainte-Claire, Mézé, Violu, Coinchimont, Québrux, Haute-Goutte, the camp at Gude, the farm at Mathis, the Pré de Raves, Lesseux, Provenchères and La Croix-le-Prêtre. French burials total 953, with 12 Russian and I Romanian grave.

== Gallery of images ==
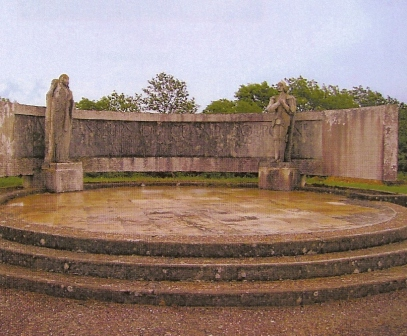
Monument at Ste Géneviève.

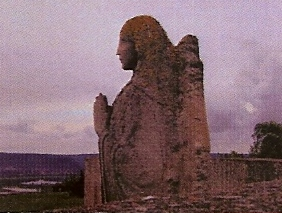
Monument at Ste Géneviève.

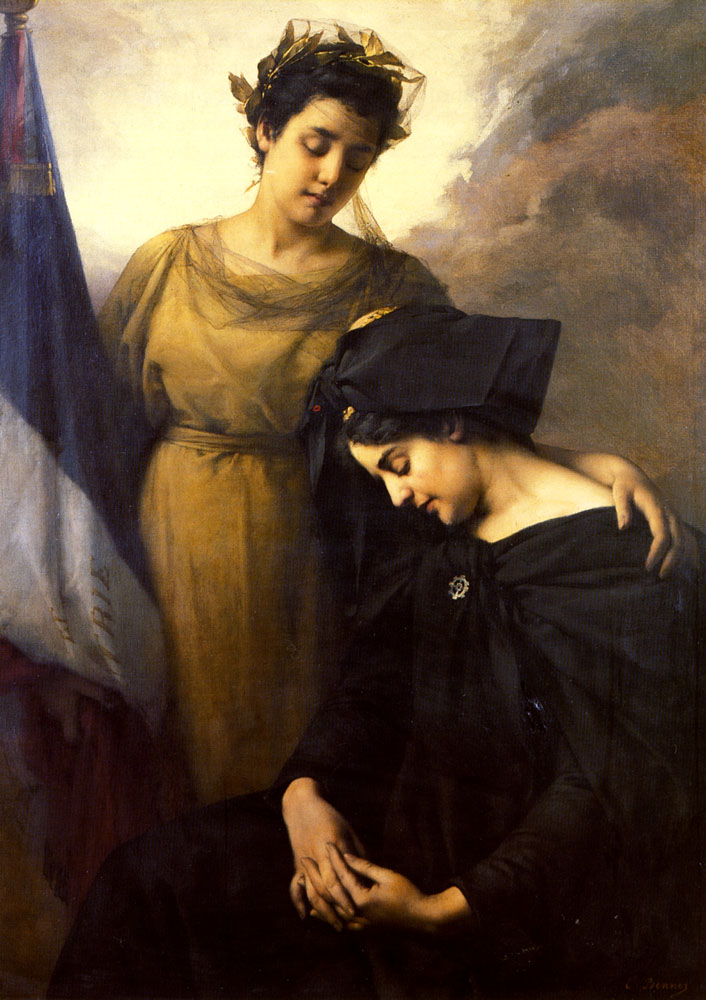
Emmanuel Benner's 1895 painting "The loss of Alsace Lorraine" depicts France comforting Alsace-Lorraine, lost to the Germans in the Franco-Prussian war.

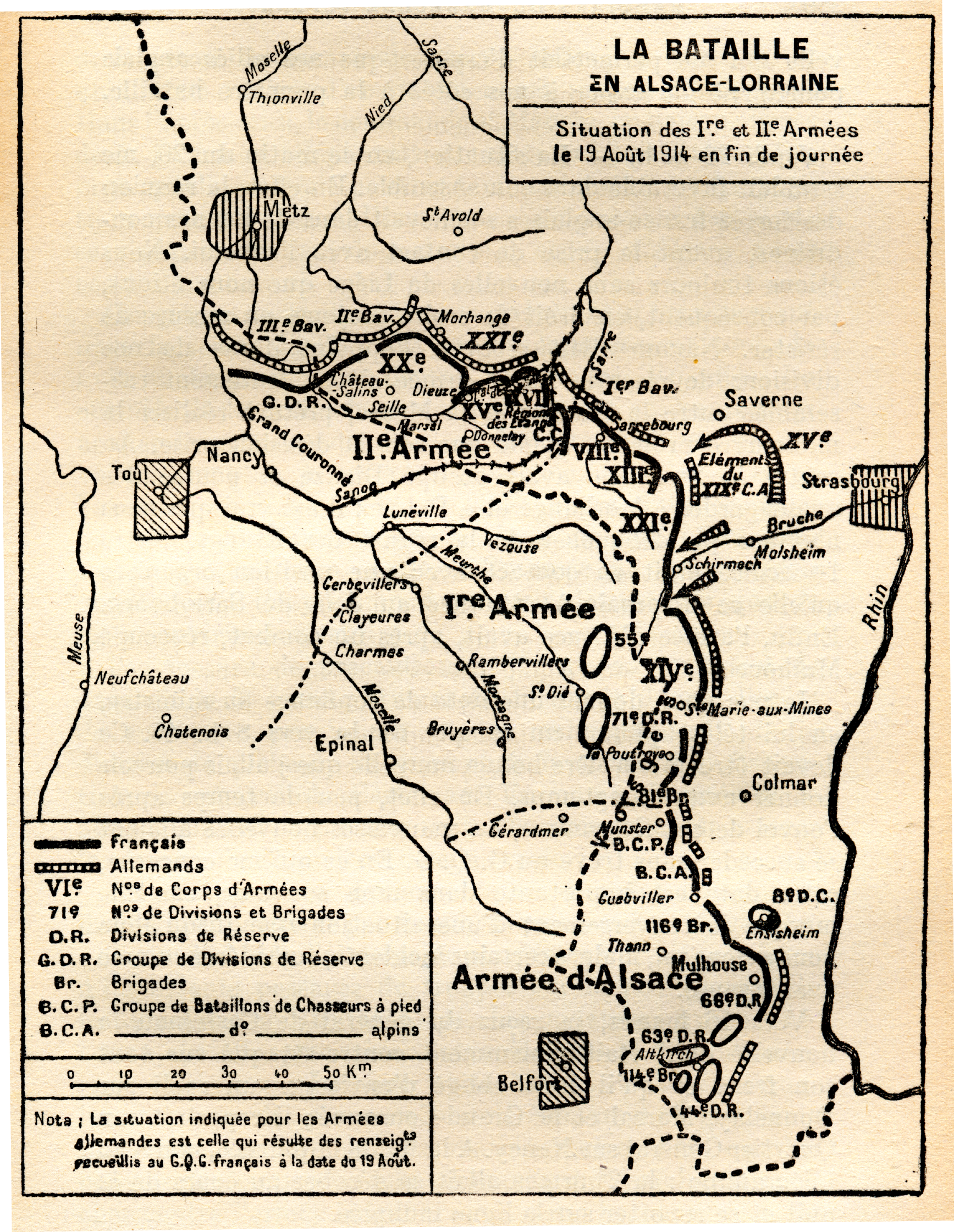
Map showing position of armies on 19 August 1914 prior to fighting at Morhange-Sarrebourg.

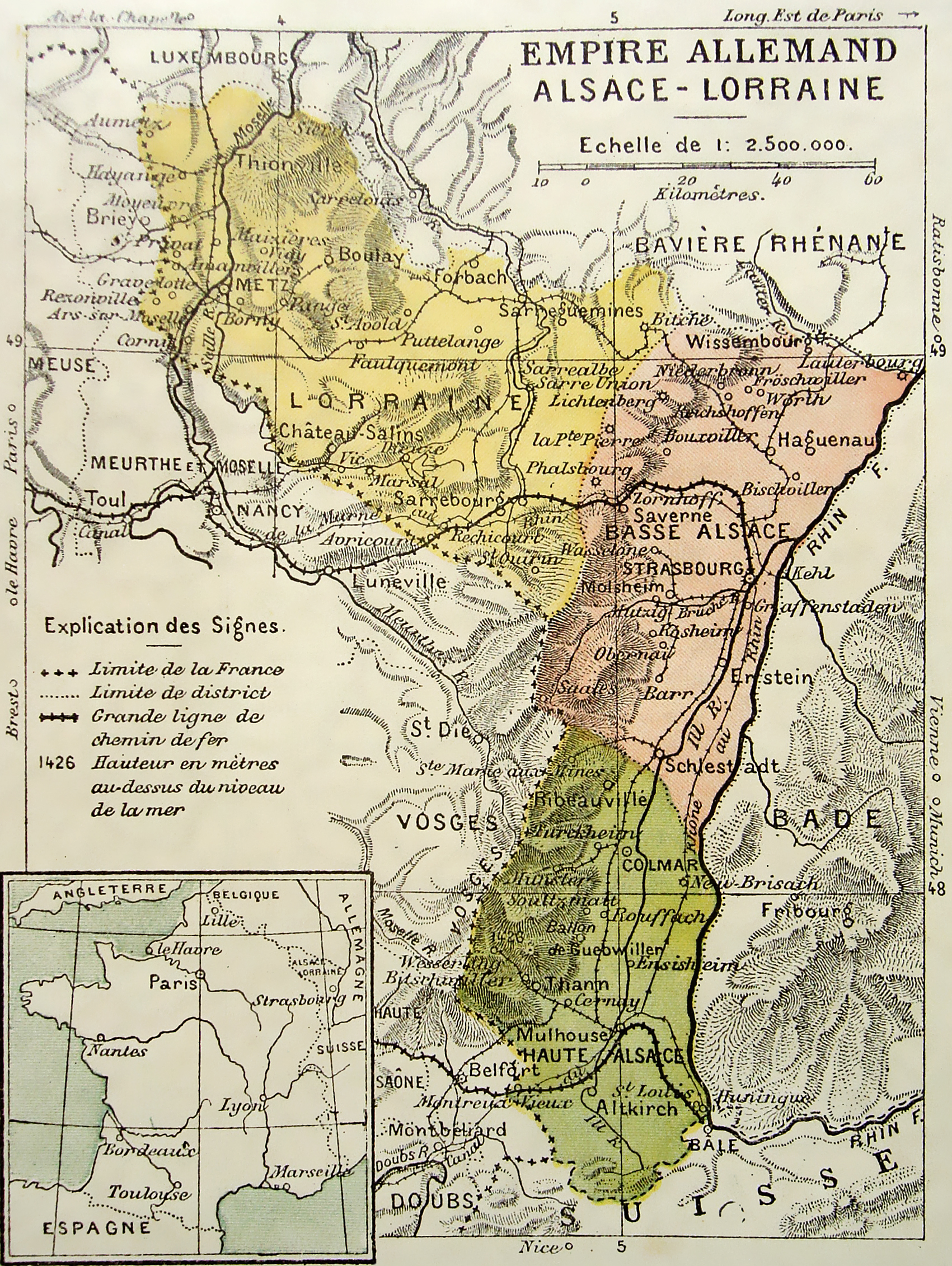
An old German map of "German Empire" showing Lorraine, Basse Alsace and Haut Alsace.

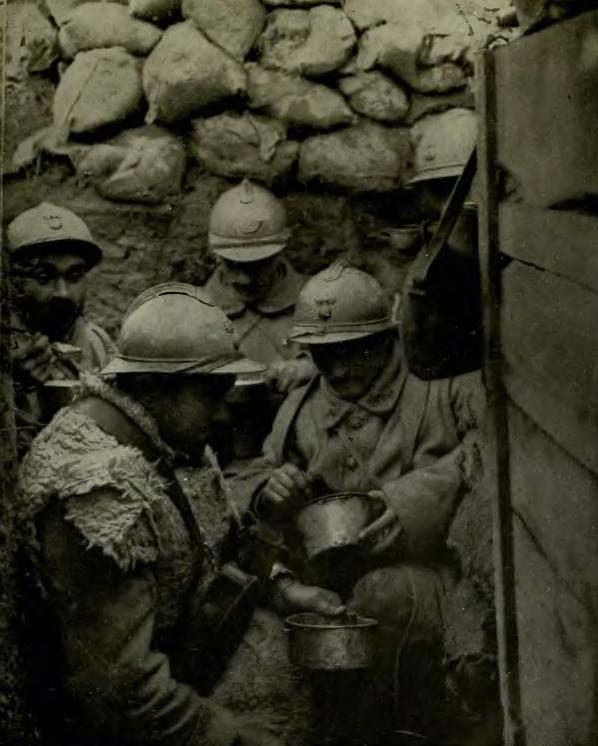
French soldiers in trench.

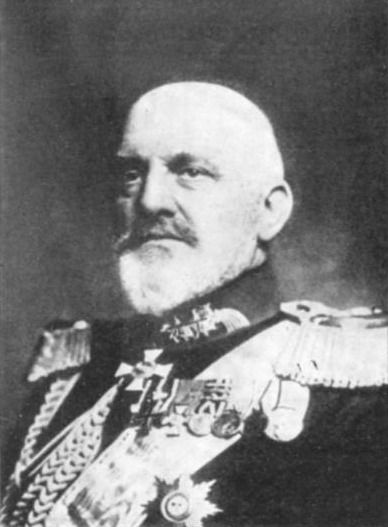
The German General Josias von Heeringen.

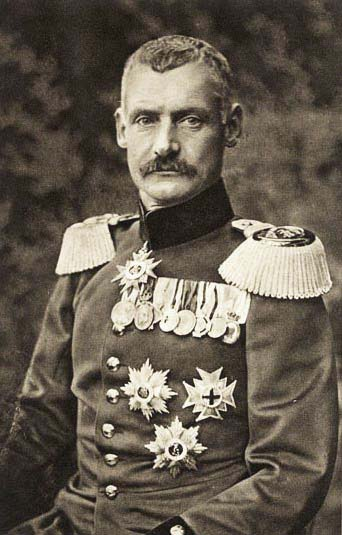
Prince Rupprecht of Bavaria.

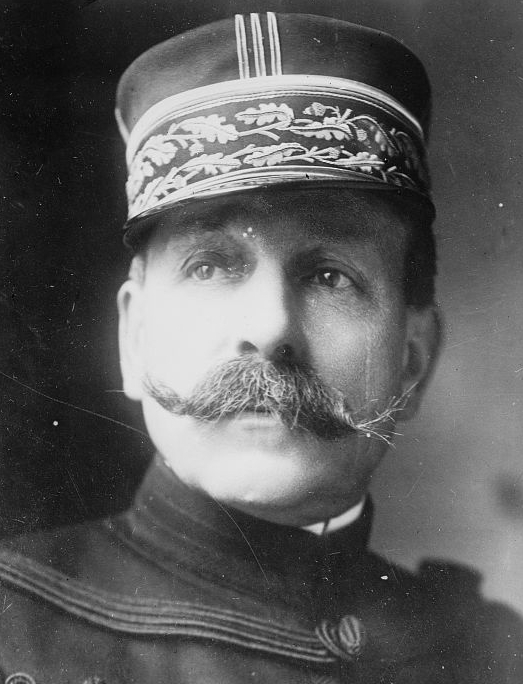
Auguste Dubail Commander of French 1st Army.

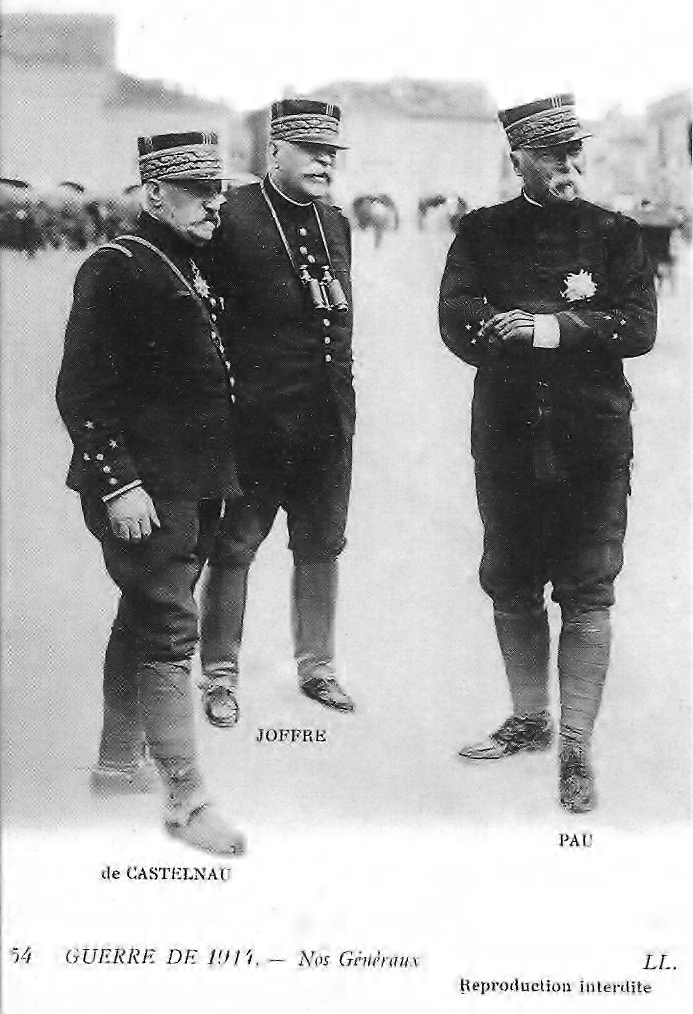
General Castelnau shown on the left commanded the 2nd French Army, Joffre in the centre was the French Commander in Chief. General Pau shown to the right commanded the "Army of Alsace".

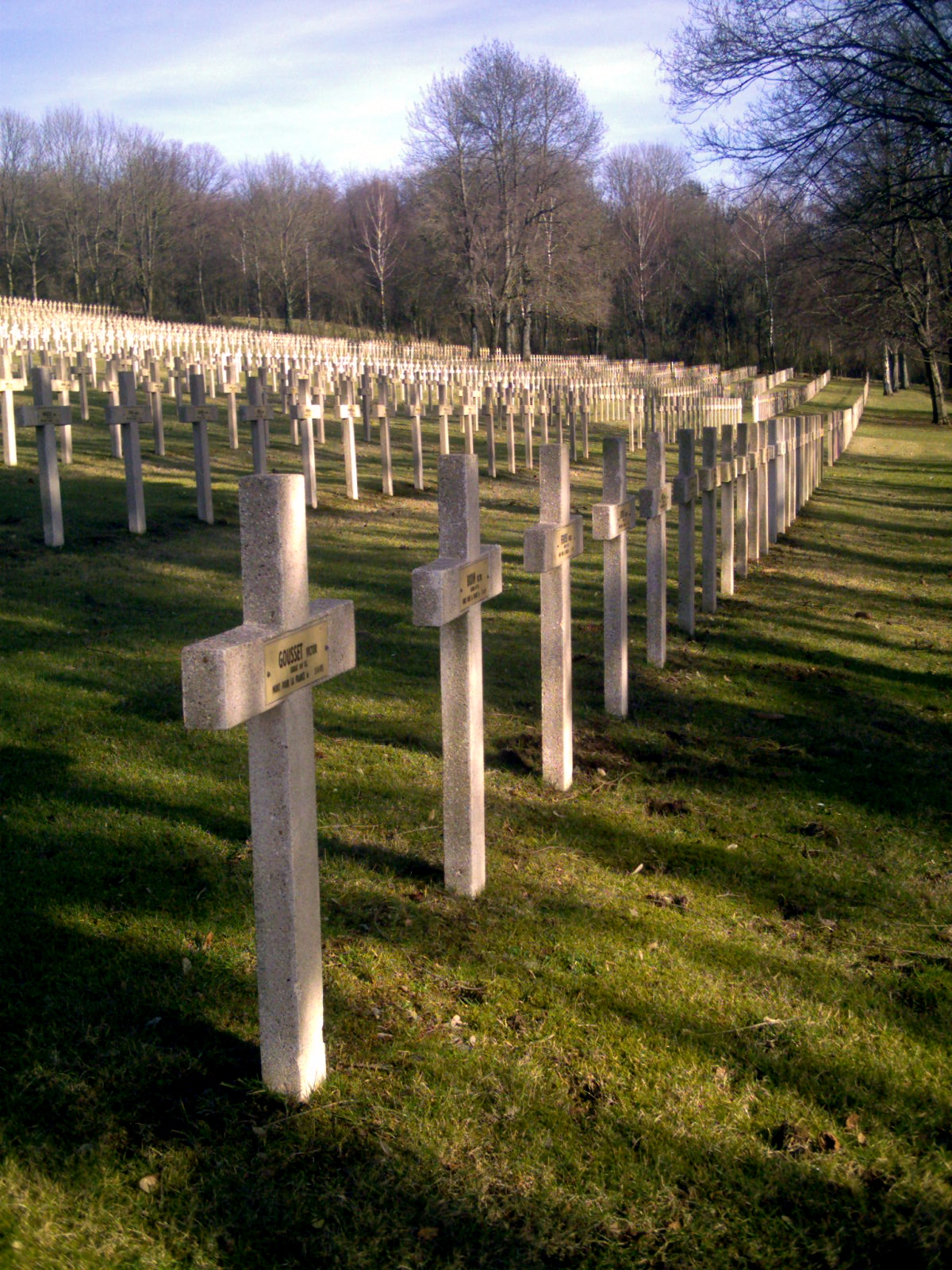
Crosses mark soldiers' graves in the "Petant" cemetery.

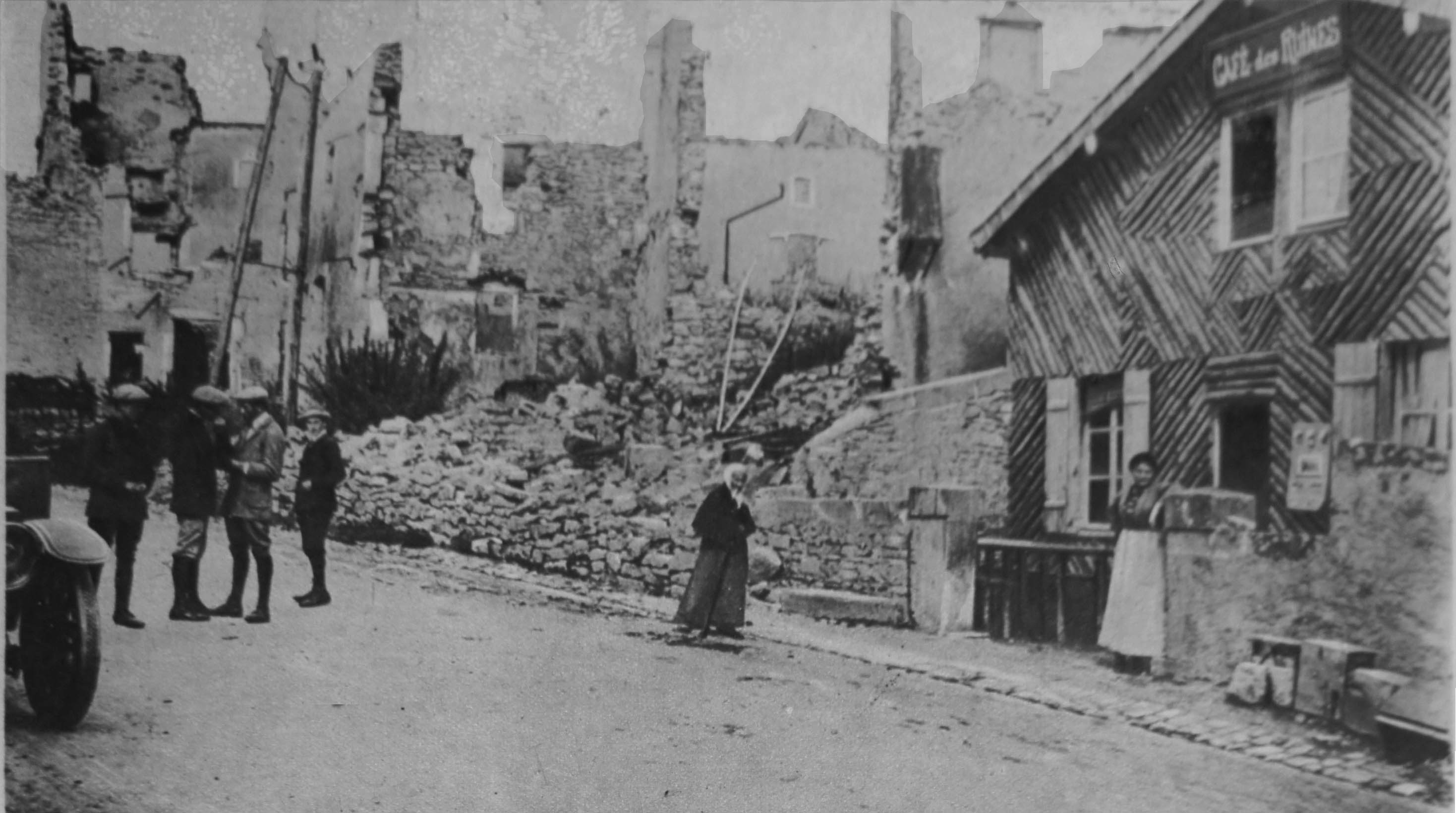
Some of the ruins of Gerbéviller.

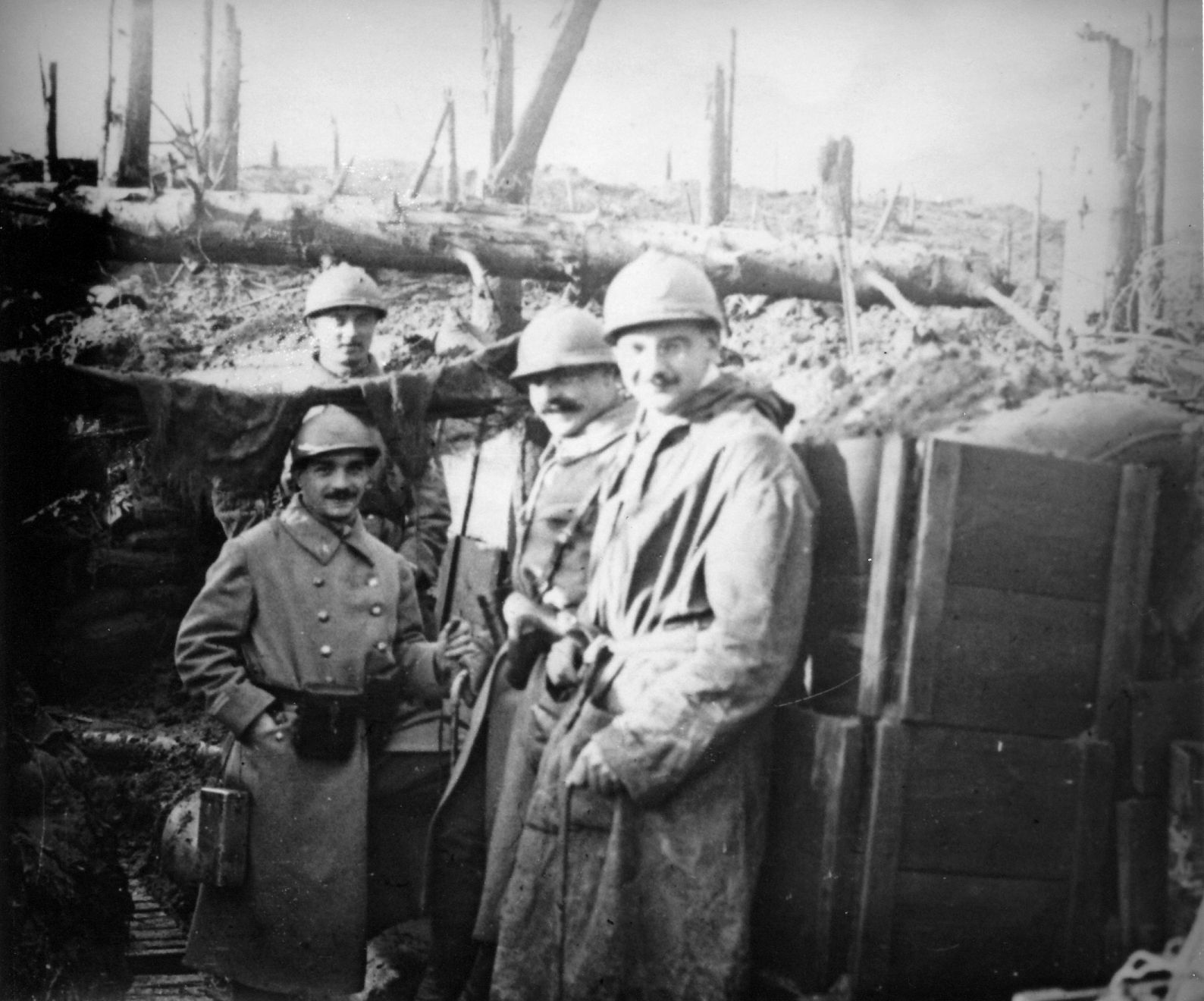
French soldiers at La Chapelotte.

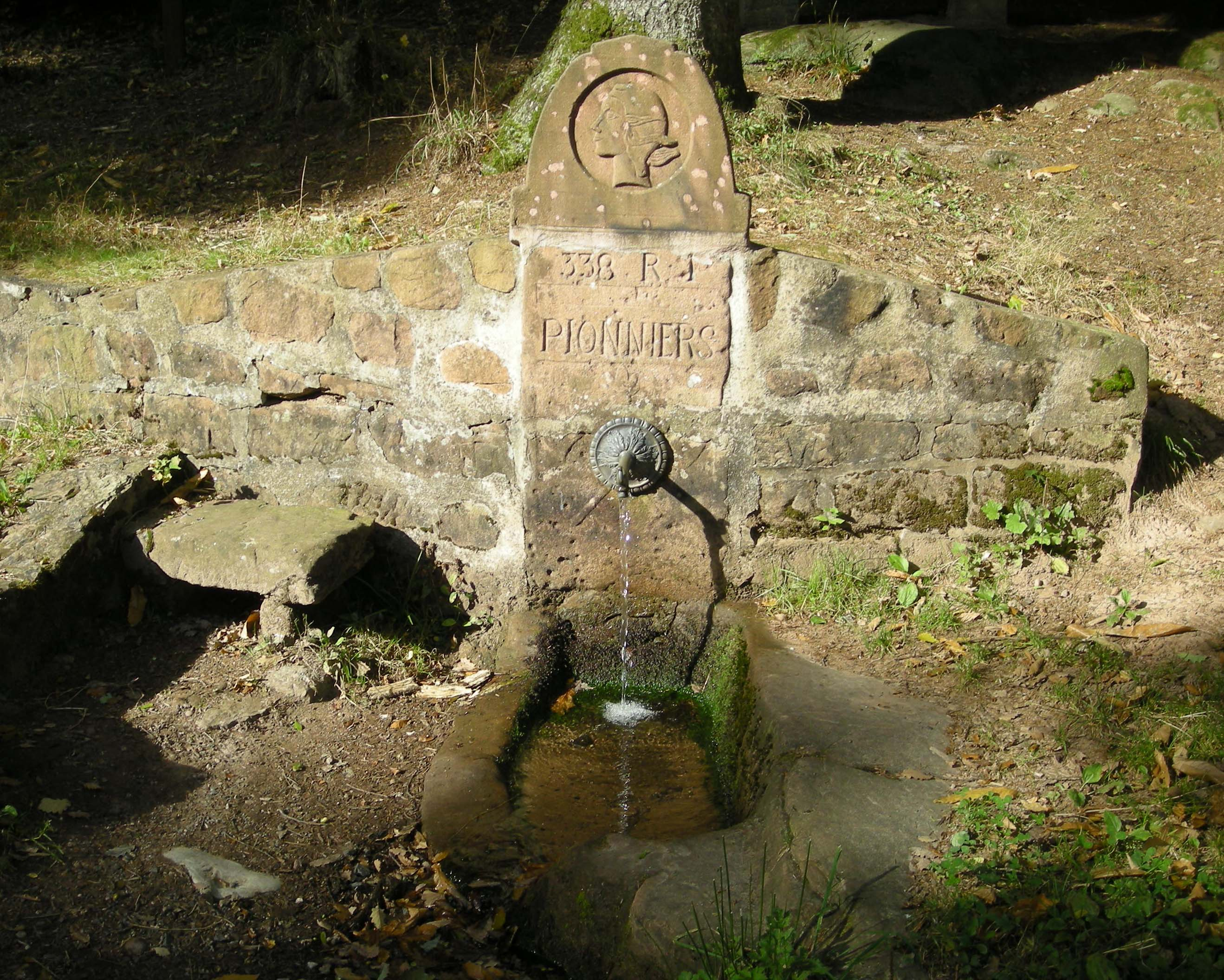
Drinking fountain erected by French soldiers at Le Chapolette.

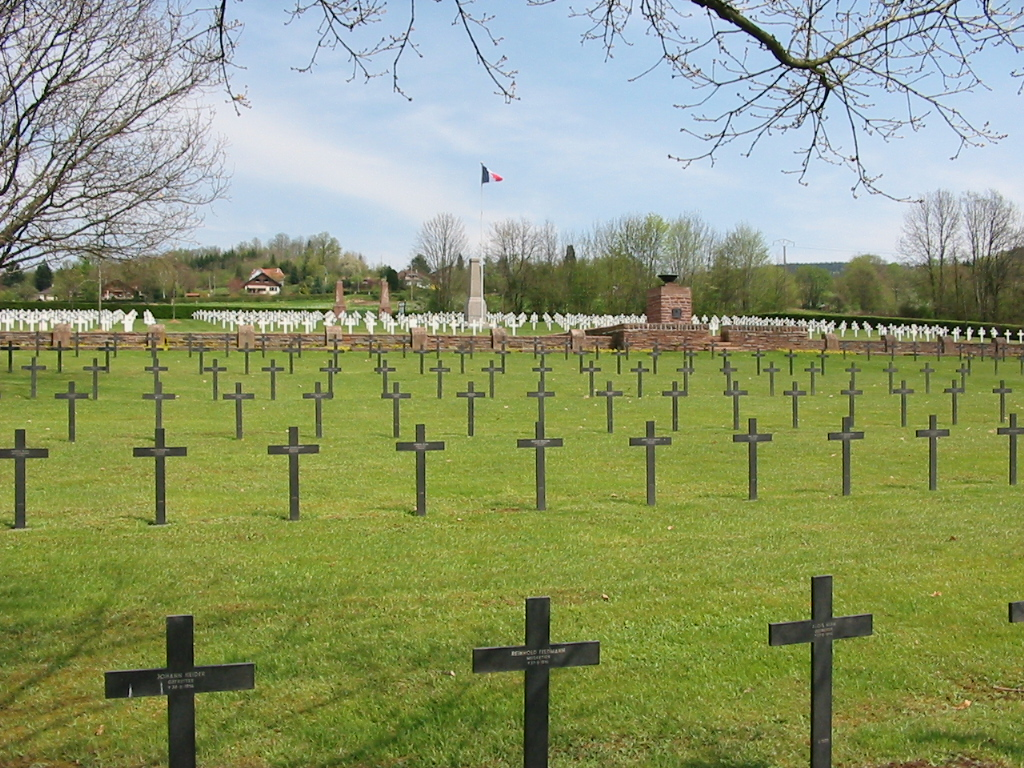
The French and German Cemeteries at Bertrimoutier.

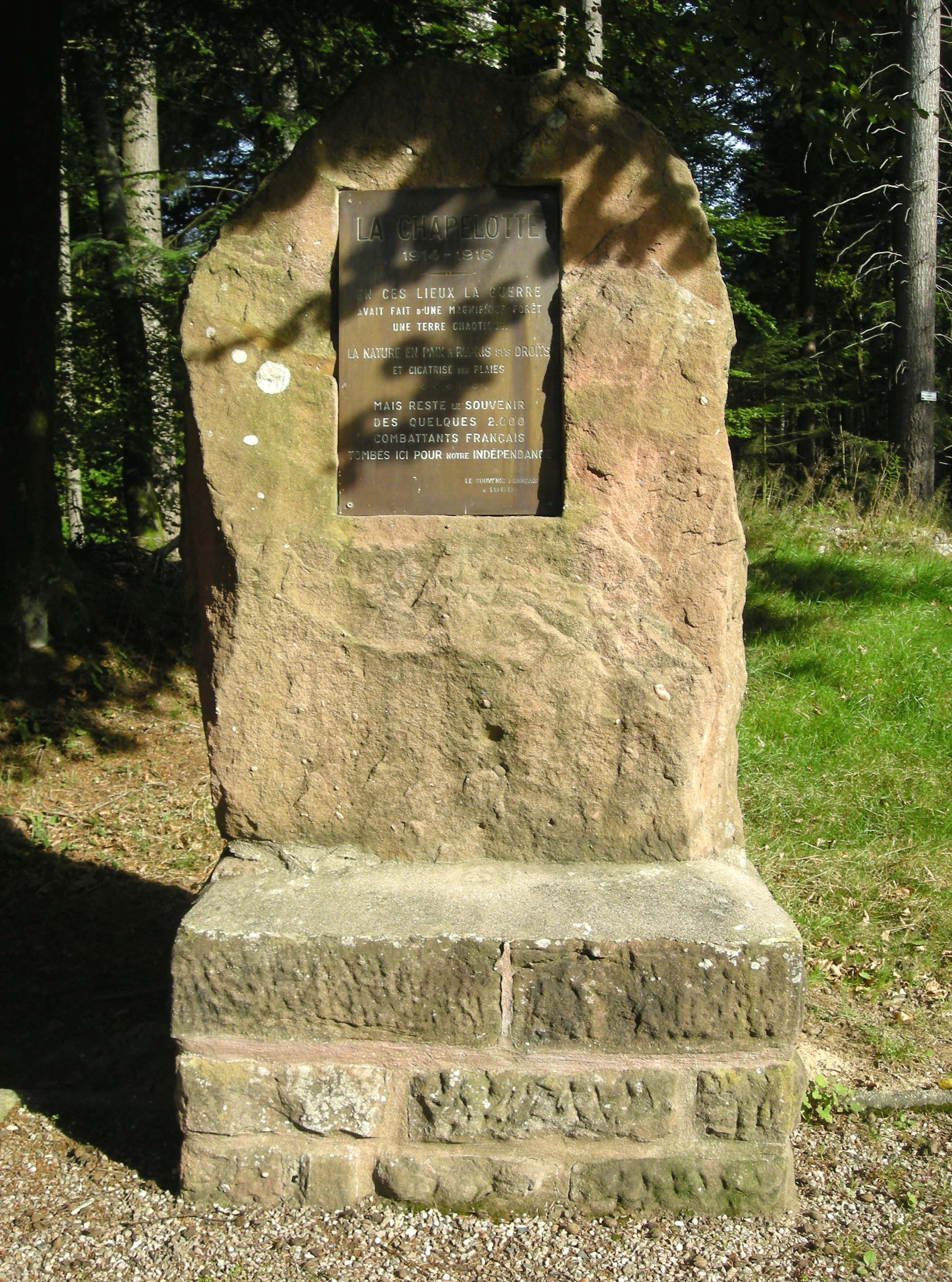
Memorial at La Chapelotte.

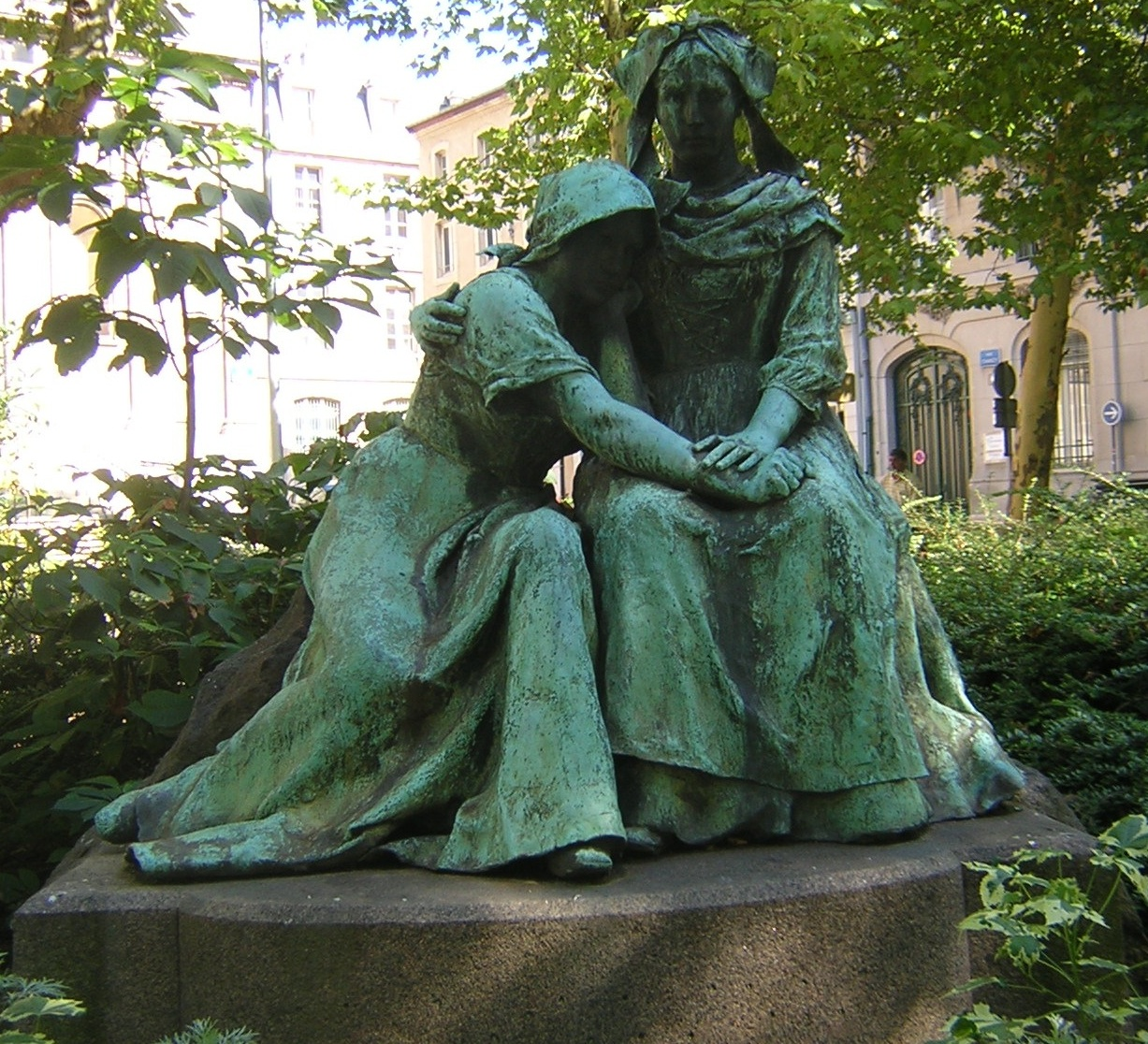
Sculpture by Paul Dubois in place Maginot in Nancy. Called "Le Souvenir", it remembers the loss of Alsace and the Moselle in the Franco-Prussian War.

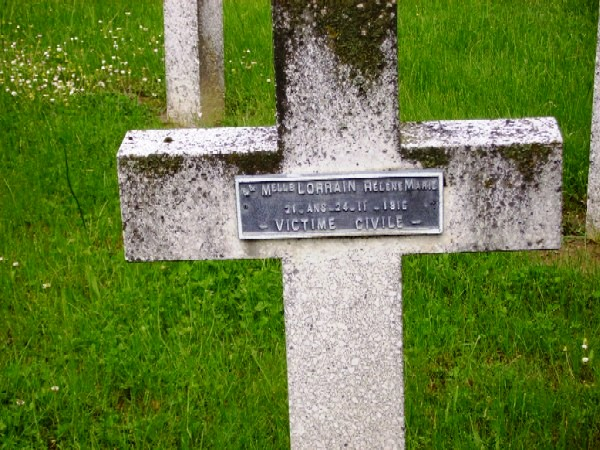
The grave in Nancy South cemetery which marks the burial of one of the civilians killed in the German bombing of Nancy 1914–1918.

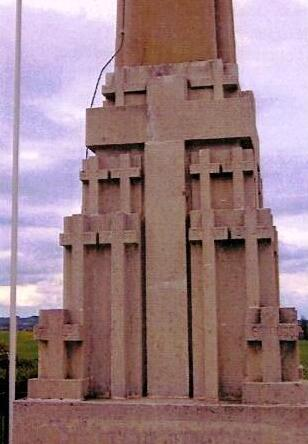
Crosses at the base of the Bidestroff monument.

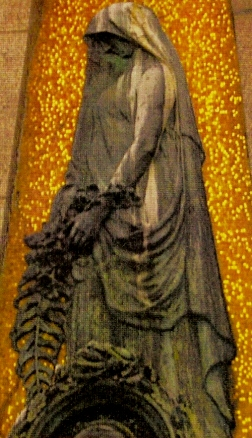
Bronze at Chamenoux by Gatelet.

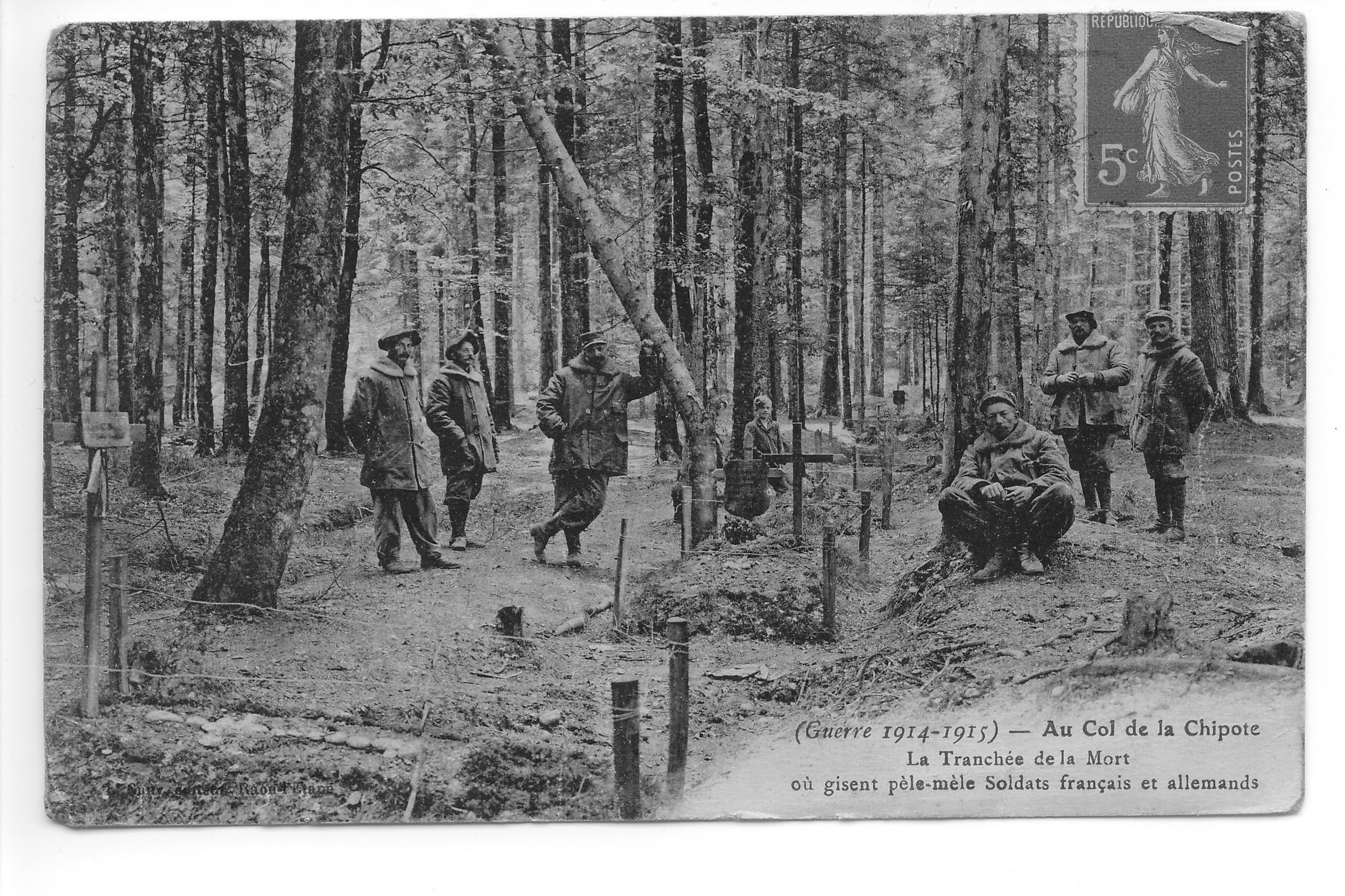
Taken after the fighting at the Col de la Chipotte in August 1914.

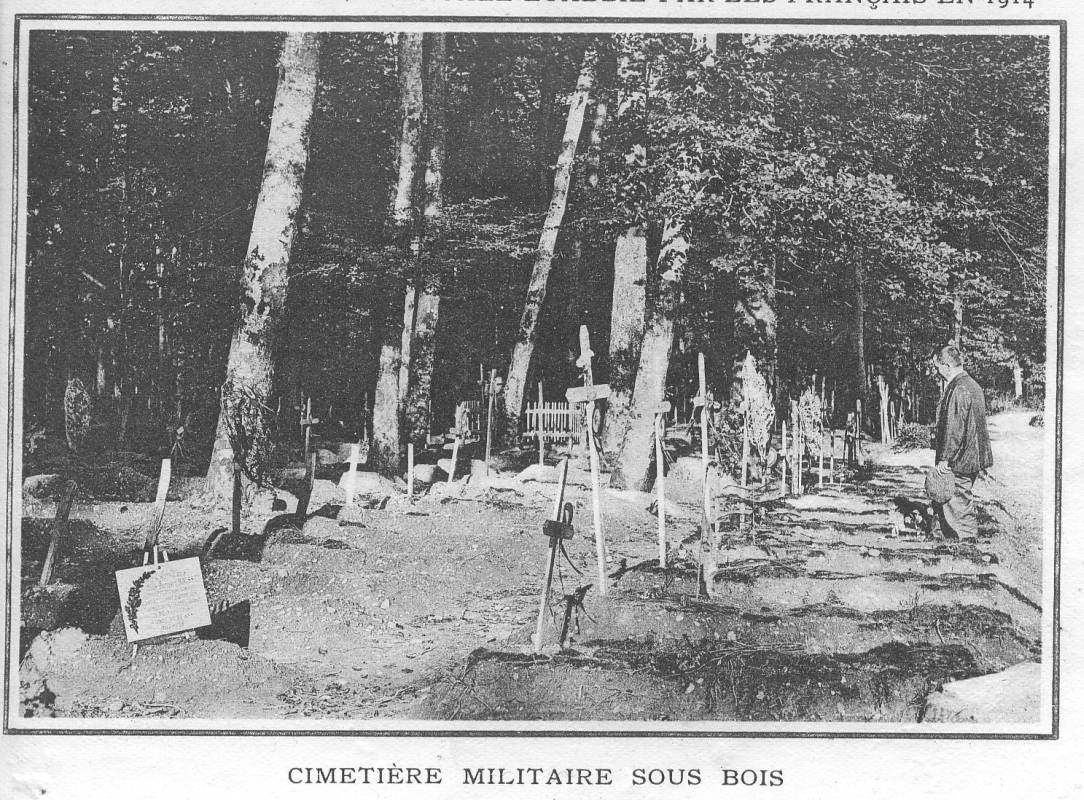
Graves made just after the fighting in the Col de la Chipotte.

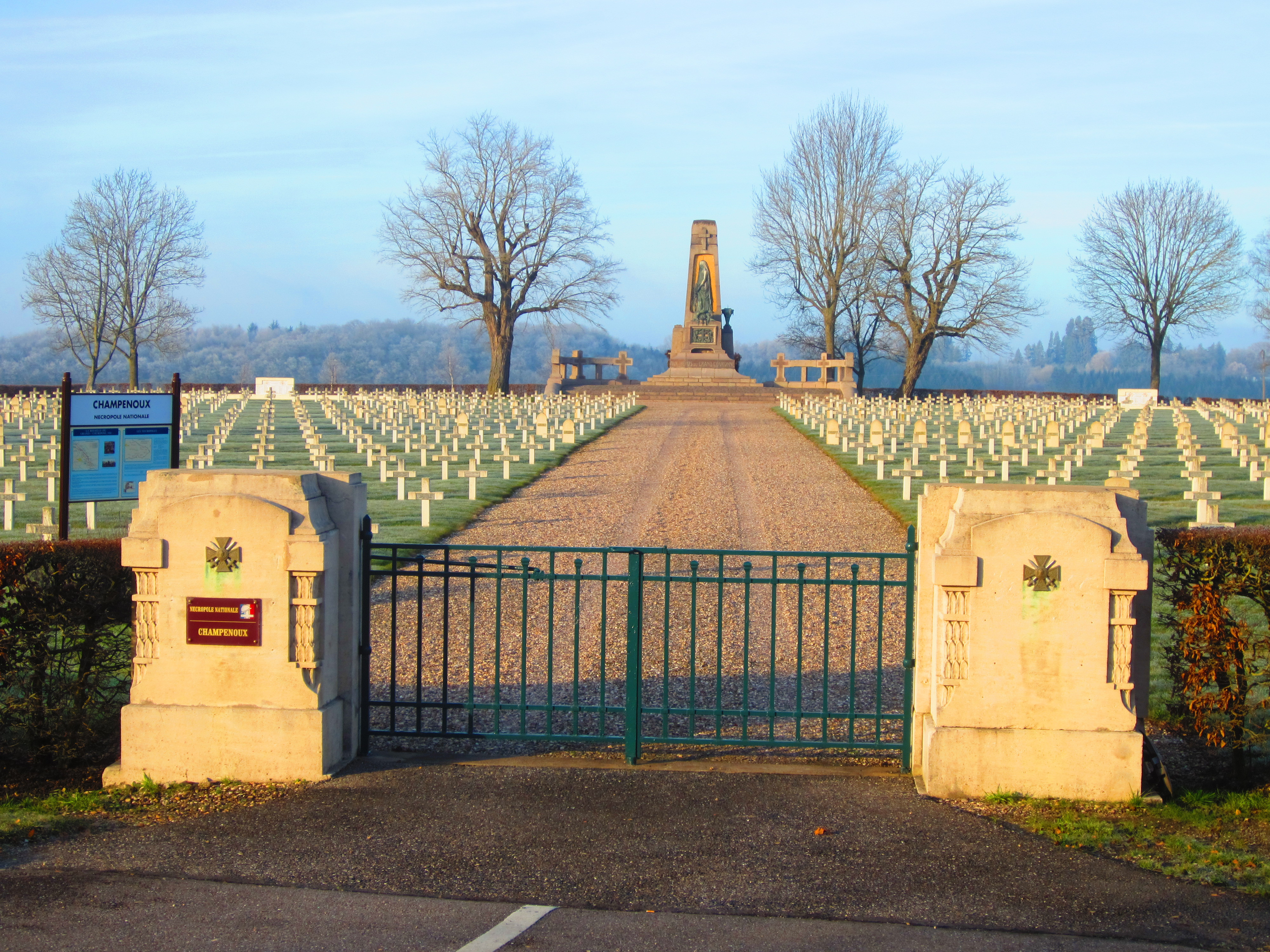
Military Cemetery at Champenoux. The Morhange monument can be seen in the distance.

== See also ==
- List of World War I Memorials and Cemeteries in Alsace
- List of World War I memorials and cemeteries in the Argonne
- List of World War I memorials and cemeteries in Artois
- List of World War I memorials and cemeteries in Champagne-Ardennes
- List of World War I memorials and cemeteries in Flanders
- List of World War I memorials and cemeteries in the Somme
- List of World War I memorials and cemeteries in Verdun
- List of World War I memorials and cemeteries in the area of the St Mihiel salient
