= List of World War I memorials and cemeteries in the Argonne =

The Forest of Argonne in Northeastern France contains several World War I memorials, monuments, ossuaries and cemeteries. These are dedicated to the soldiers who died in combat during that war from the United States, France, Italy and the German Empire.

- Meuse-Argonne American Cemetery
- Memorial of the Butte de Vauquois
- Missouri Memorial
- Montfaucon American Monument
- Pennsylvania Memorial
- Ossuary Monument of the Haut Chevauchée
- Ossuaire de la Gruerie
- Romagne-sous-Montfaucon German Military Cemetery

== Map of Meuse-Argonne sector ==
This is a map of the Meuse–Argonne offensive in World War I.

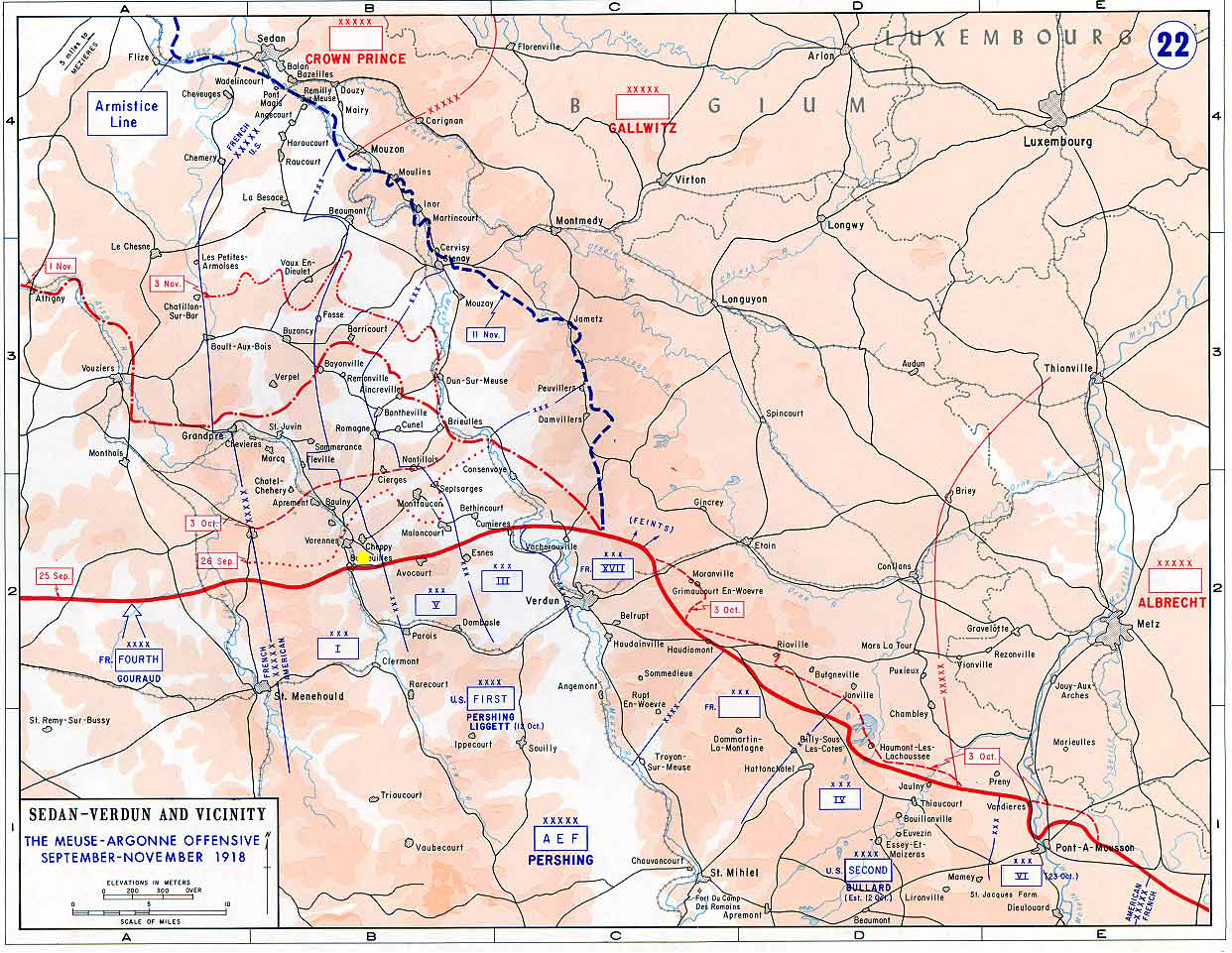
Map covering the Meuse-Argonne Offensive.

== Meuse-Argonne American Cemetery ==
=== Overview ===
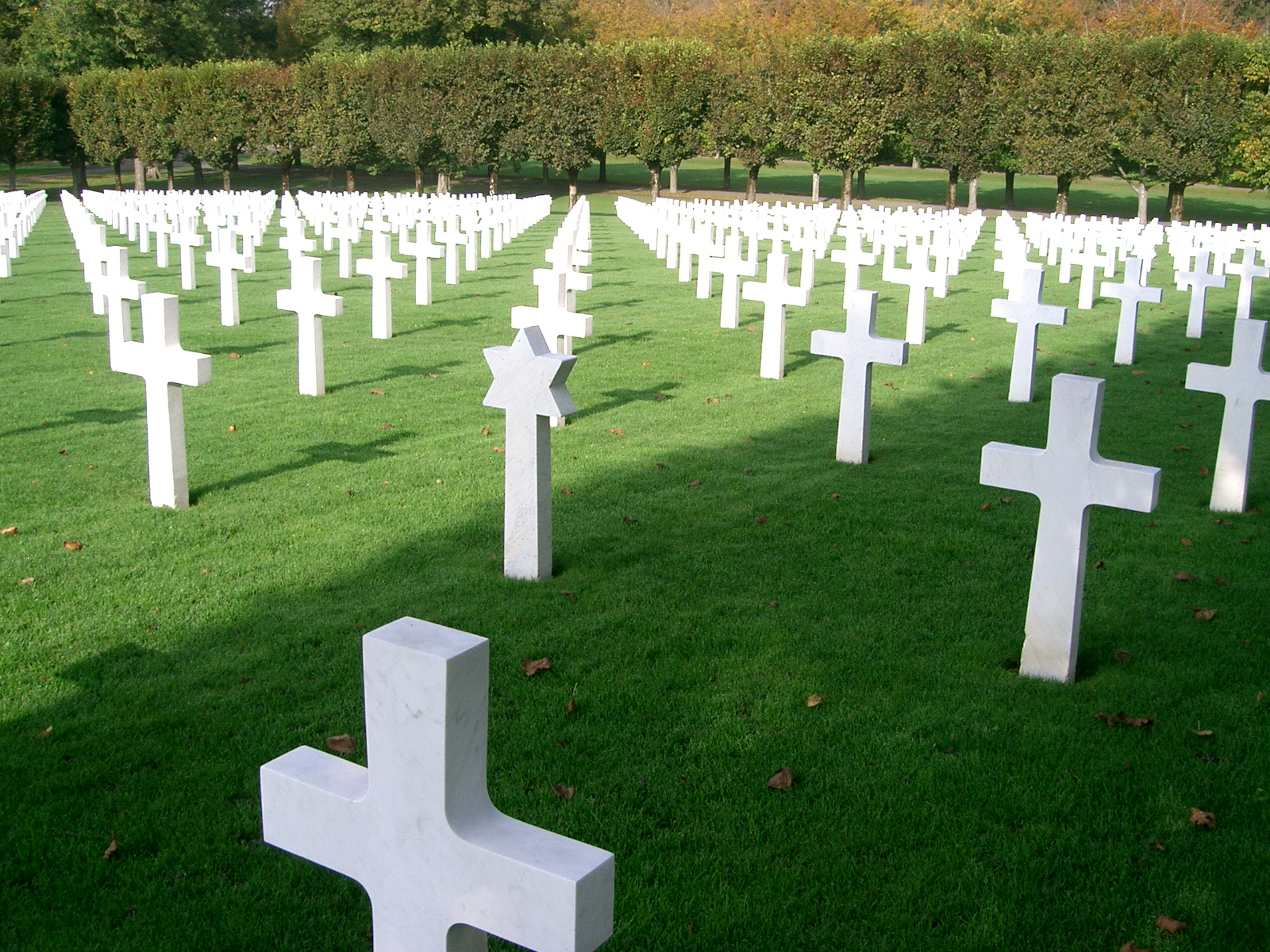
Romagne-sous-Montfaucon American Cemetery

The Meuse-Argonne American Cemetery is located near the village of Romagne-Gesnes in the Forest of Argonne, France, in the area captured by the US 32nd Infantry Division in World War I.

It is the largest American cemetery in Europe, covering 52 hectares. A stone wall over 1 1/2 miles long encircles the cemetery. It is maintained by the American Battle Monuments Commission. The cemetery was started in October 1918, The architects were the York and Sawyer firm of New York City.

The cemetery holds 14,246 graves of American soldiers who died in World War I. It includes 486 unknown soldiers.

Wall panels on the Memorial Chapel record the names of 954 soldiers whose bodies were never found. The inscription above their names states- "whose earthly resting place is known only to God".

=== Memorial chapel ===
The memorial chapel at the Meuse-Argonne American cemetery is an example of Romanesque architecture and consists of a chapel and two flanking loggias. Above the chapel main entrance is the inscription:

"Dedicated to the memory of those who died for their country"

The lintel contains the inscription:

"In sacred sleep they rest"

A bas-relief by Alfred-Alphonse Bottiau is carved into the tympanum, with figures representing "Grief" and "Remembrance".

Across the ends and front of the loggias above the arches are names of places in the region where the U.S. forces fought- "PONT-MAUGIS-BOIS DE CUNEL-MEUSE-CIERGES-BOIS DES RAPPES-CONSENVOYE-EXERMONT-GRANDPRE-MEUSE HEIGHTS-BARRICOURT HEIGHTS-GESNES-MONTFAUCON-CORNAY-BOIS DE FORET-STENAY-ARGONNE-CHEPPY-COTE DE CHATILLON". The loggia walls list the names of those missing in action from service in France and from the American Expeditionary Force, North Russia. The memorial's exterior walls and columns are of Euville Coquiller stone and the interior walls are of Salamandre travertine.

The chapel has stained-glass windows by Heinigke & Smith that show the insignia of the American Divisions and larger units which made up the American Expeditionary Force.

== Memorial of the Butte de Vauquois ==
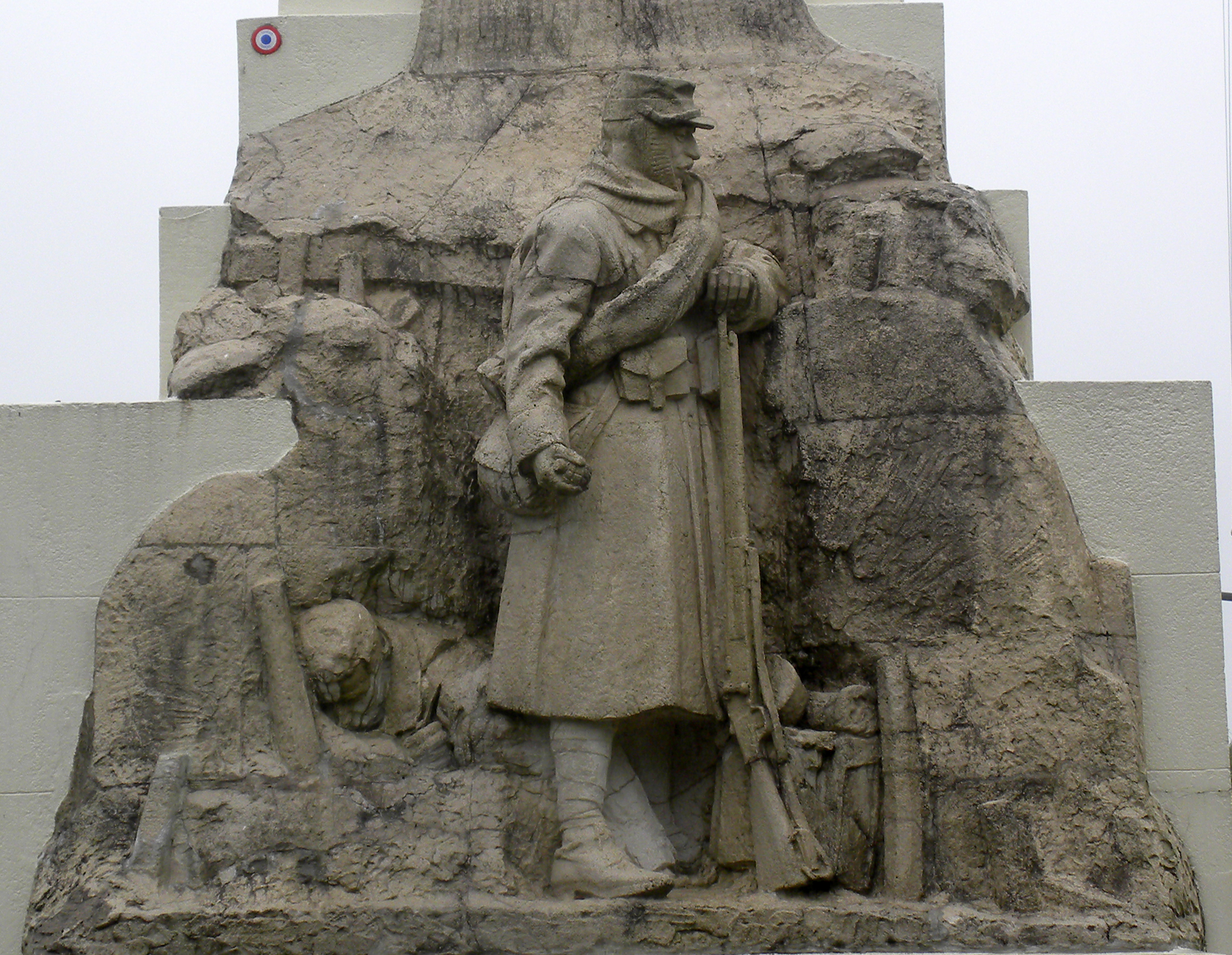
Sculpture on Butte de Vauquois monument

The summit of the Butte de Vauguois contains a memorial to French soldiers who died at the Battle of Vauquois.

The memorial contains an obelisk in the shape of a "Lantern of the Dead". One side of the obelisk has a sculpture of a French Infantryman with a grenade in one hand and rifle in the other. Behind the soldier is a carving of the trunk of a mutilated tree. This represents an actual tree which used to stand on almost the same spot as the monument, and which was used as a "marker" by the French artillery. At the infantryman's feet is a tunneller who is sleeping on the floor of a trench.

The French memorial was designed by the Paris architect Edouard Monestès and the sculptural work was by Marius Roussel.

One victim of the fighting at Vauquois was the politician Henri Collignon, who enrolled in the Army at age 58. A small memorial in the area is dedicated to him.

== Missouri Memorial ==
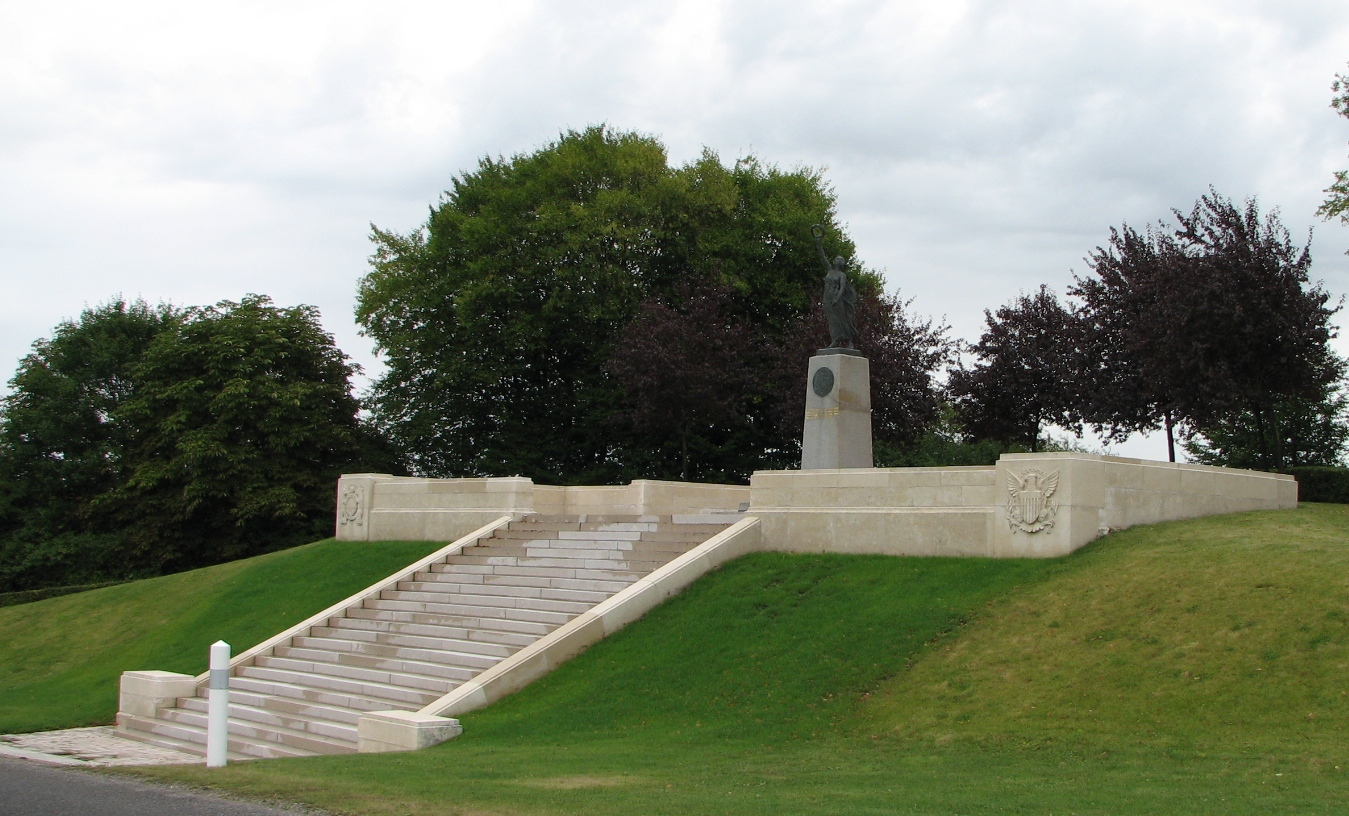
Monument at Cheppy

The Missouri Memorial at Cheppy, France, is dedicated to soldiers from the State of Missouri who died in World War I. It was erected by the state government.

The monument comprises a stone pedestal with a bronze "Angel of Victory" figure on the top. This stands in a walled area reached by a series of steps.

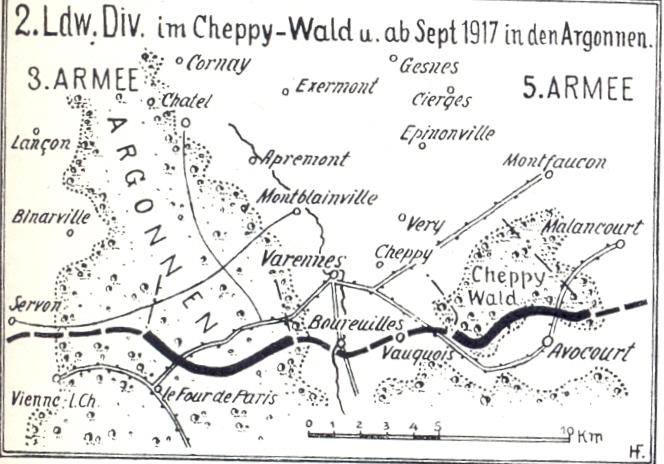
German map of 1917

=== Overview ===
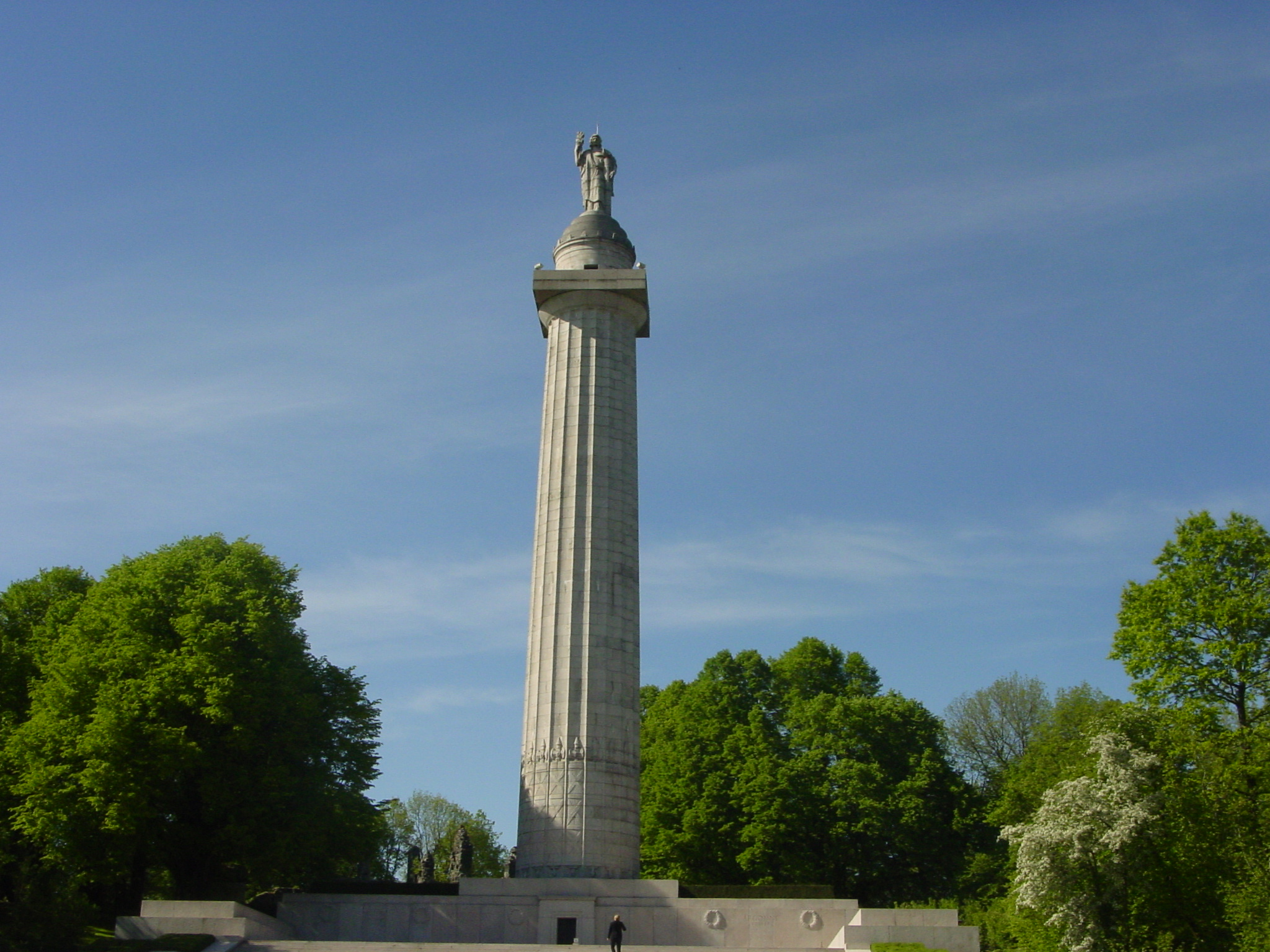
The Montfaucon monument

The Montfaucon American monument is located 20 northwest of Verdun, France. It rises 200 feet above the ruins of the village of Montfaucon. The hilltop was originally an observation point for the German army. It was captured on 27 September 1918 by the US Army 37th Division and the 79th Division as part of the Meuse-Argonne Offensive in World War I.

The monument commemorates this American victory along with the previous efforts of the French Army. It is maintained by the American Battle Monuments Commission.

The monument was inaugurated on 1 August 1937, in a ceremony attended by the President of France, Albert Lebrun, French General Philippe Pétain, and Pershing. U.S. President Franklin D. Roosevelt delivered a radio address for the ceremony from Washington.

The architect was John Russell Pope of New York City.

=== Monument ===
The 180 foot shaft is made of Baveno granite and takes the form of a Doric column surmounted by a figure symbolising "Liberty". The monument faces the U.S. First Army's line of departure on 26 September.

The names of the four most important areas captured by American troops appear in large letters across the front of the monument. These are

"MEUSE HEIGHTS, BARRICOURT HEIGHTS, ROMAGNE HEIGHTS AND ARGONNE FOREST"

The monument vestibule contains an account of the battle and a map of the Meuse Argonne offensive in polished marble. There is also the text of a tribute by American General John J. Pershing to his soldiers. The wall surrounding the main terrace lists the divisions in the First Army and the places where they fought.

The observation platform can be accessed by a circular stairway of 234 steps. The ruins of Saint-Germain Abbey are close to the monument.

== Pennsylvania Memorial ==
The Pennsylvania Memorial was erected by the State of Pennsylvania in 1927 at Varennes en Argonne, France, to honor Pennsylvania soldiers who died in France in World War I. It was constructed in the Greek style.

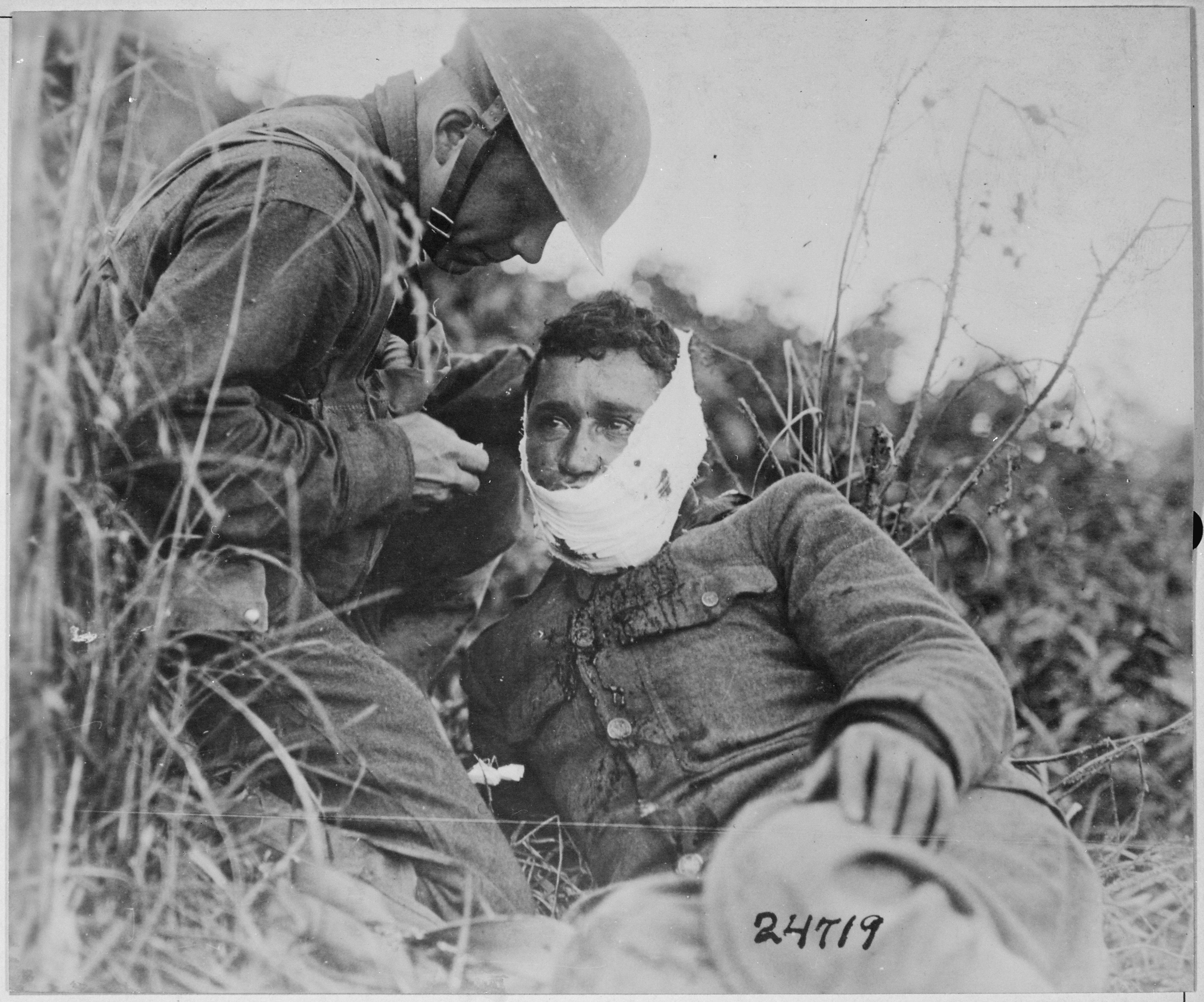
Soldier of Company K, 110th Regiment Infantry (formerly 3rd and 10th Infantry, Pennsylvania National Guard), just wounded, receiving first-aid treatment from a comrade. Varennes-en-Argonne, France., 09/26/1918

== Ossuary Monument of the Haut Chevauchée ==
The monument of the Haute Chevauchée is dedicated to the French, American and Italian soldiers who died fighting in the Forest of Argonne in World War I. It was designed by the architect Bolloré, inaugurated on 30 July 1922 by Raymond Poincaré and blessed by Monseigneur Ginisty, the Roman Catholic Bishop of Verdun.

Not far from the monument is the "Cross of Reconciliation" erected in 1973 by the "Comité Commémoratif d'Argonne" in a gesture of Franco-German reconciliation.

The 9-metre-high (30 ft) stone monument is surmounted with the bust of a soldier whose hands clasp the handle of a sword which overlays a cross. The flanks of the memorial are engraved with the numbers of the 275 French regiments, 18 Italian Regiments and 32 American Divisions that served in the Argonne Sector.

The monument crypt contains an ossuary containing the remains of several thousand unknown soldiers. There is an altar at the base of the monument for ceremonial use. The sculptor Becker had based the soldier's face on that of his son who had been killed in 1915.

== Ossuaire de la Gruerie ==
The ossuary is located in Saint-Thomas-en-Argonne, France, opposite the French National cemetery.

It was created in 1923 when the remains of approximately 10,000 unknown soldiers from World War I were discovered when the area around La Biesme and the woods of la Gruerie was cleared.

== French National Cemetery ==
The French National Cemetery in Saint-Thomas-en-Argonneholds the bodies of 8,085 French soldiers who died in World War I, of whom 3,324 were placed in two ossuaries.

The monument to the French 128th Infantry Division is located in this cemetery.

== Romagne-sous-Montfaucon German Military Cemetery ==
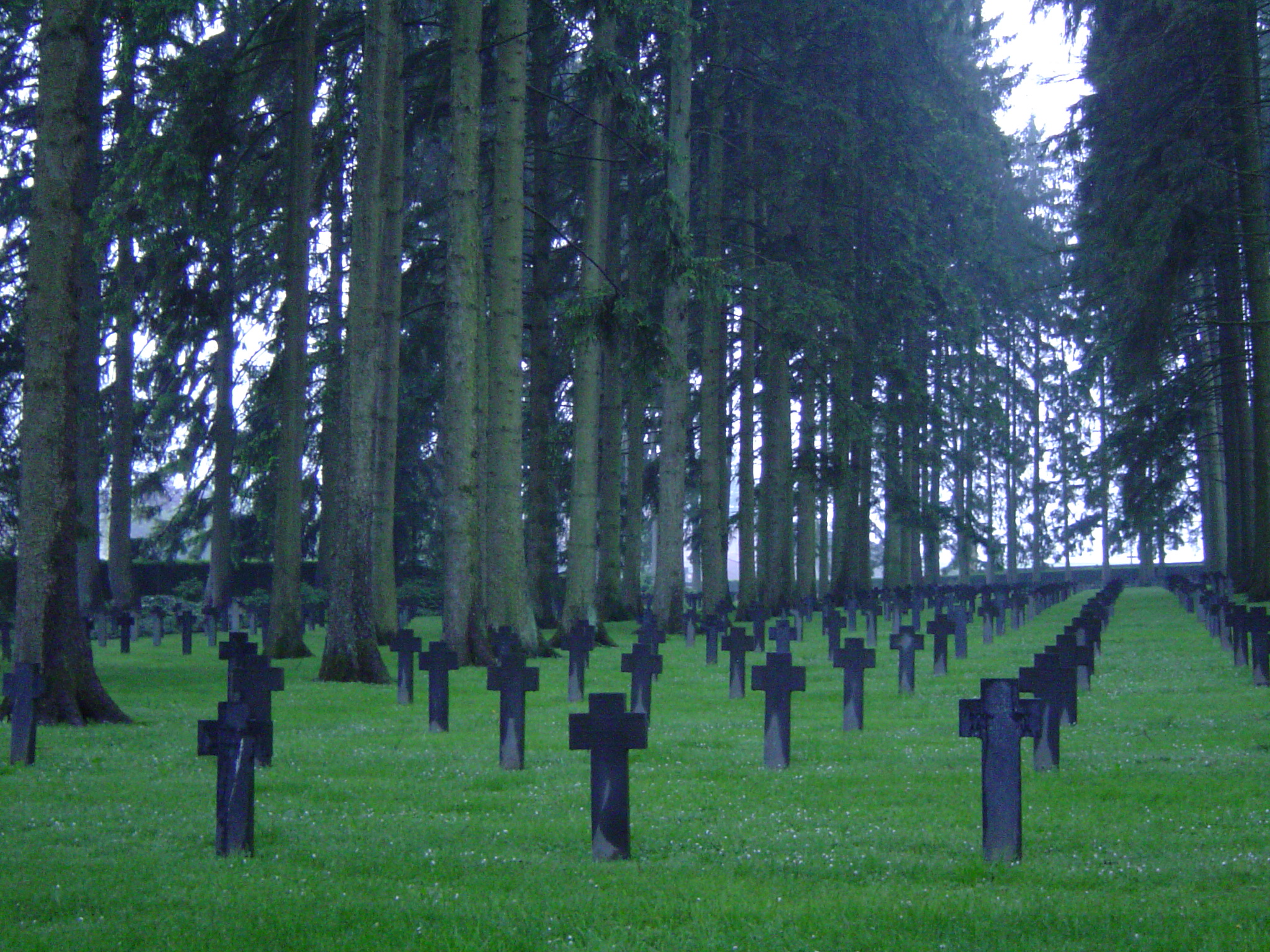
German graves at Romagne-sous-Montfaucon

The German military cemetery in Romagne-sous-Montfaucon, France, contains the graves of 1412 German and four French soldiers who died in World War I.

The cemetery was opened by the German Army in August 1914 after heavy fighting in the area. A number of military hospitals were set up in the area all of which required a suitable burial ground.

The entrance to the cemetery displays a mosaic entitled "Hier Ruhen Deutsche Soldaten": "Here lie German soldiers".

=== Kaiser Tunnel ===
In November 1915 the Germans created the Kaiser tunnel complex, one of 11 tunnels they build. They destroyed it on 24 September 1918.

The Kaiser tunnel was one of eleven created by the Germans which crossed the Haute Chevauchée and allowed soldiers to live in relative security. These tunnels housed combatants, provisions and arms and munition and could also be used to ferry injured men away from the front. The Kaiser tunnel was created by Bavarian troops without help from engineers and its main artery was 350 metres long and contained galleries with a total length of 425 metres. It led on to the "Bataillon Tunnel" in the south and the Ortlieb-Tunnel leading north. The three tunnels had a total length of 800 metres. Generators were installed to allow the supply of electric lighting and there were ventilators, numerous pumps and even a telephone system in the northern section. There was also a hospital facility with sixty beds and an operating theatre.

== Gallery ==
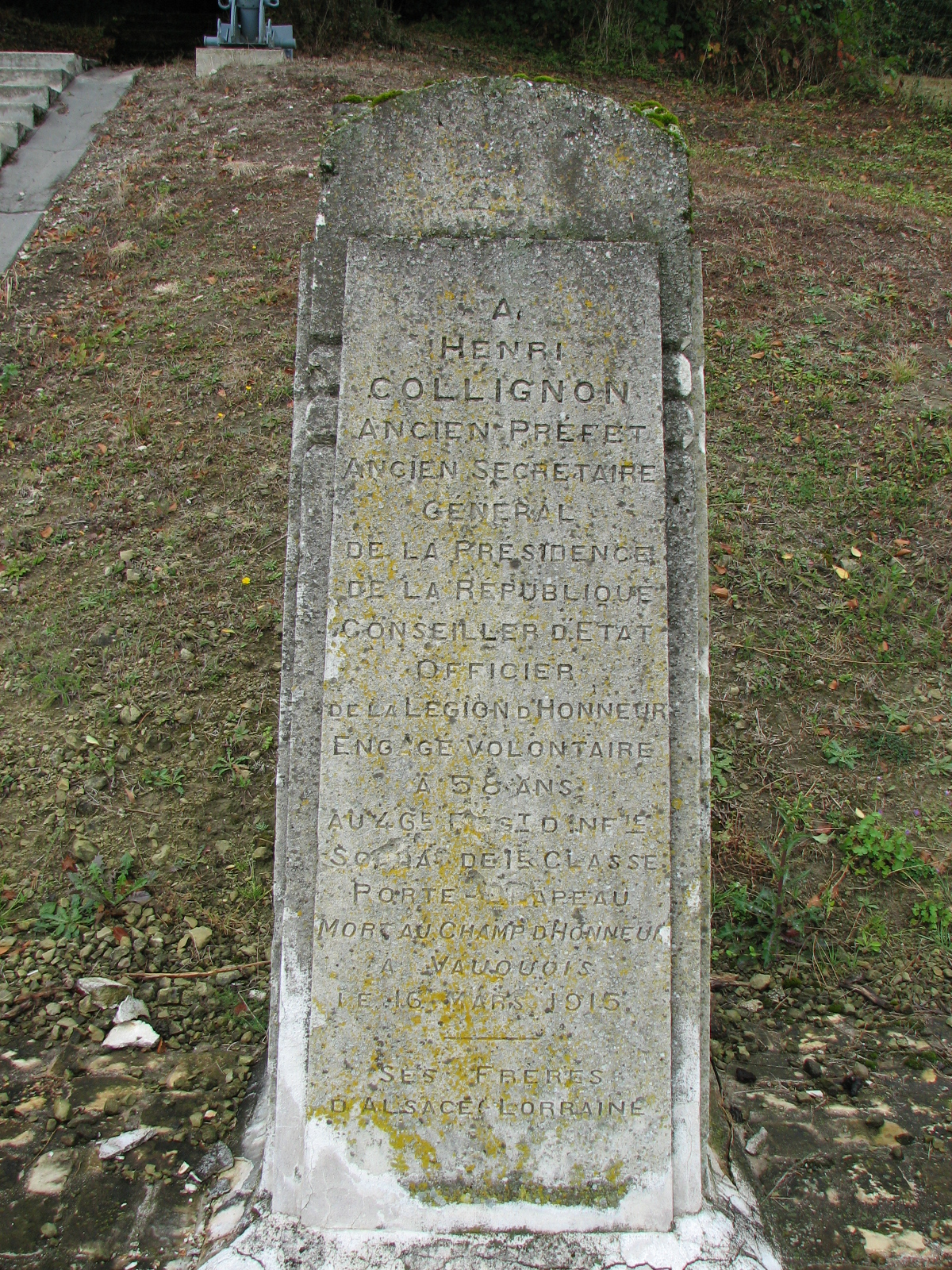
Monument dedicated to Henri Collignon at the foot of the Butte de Vauquois.

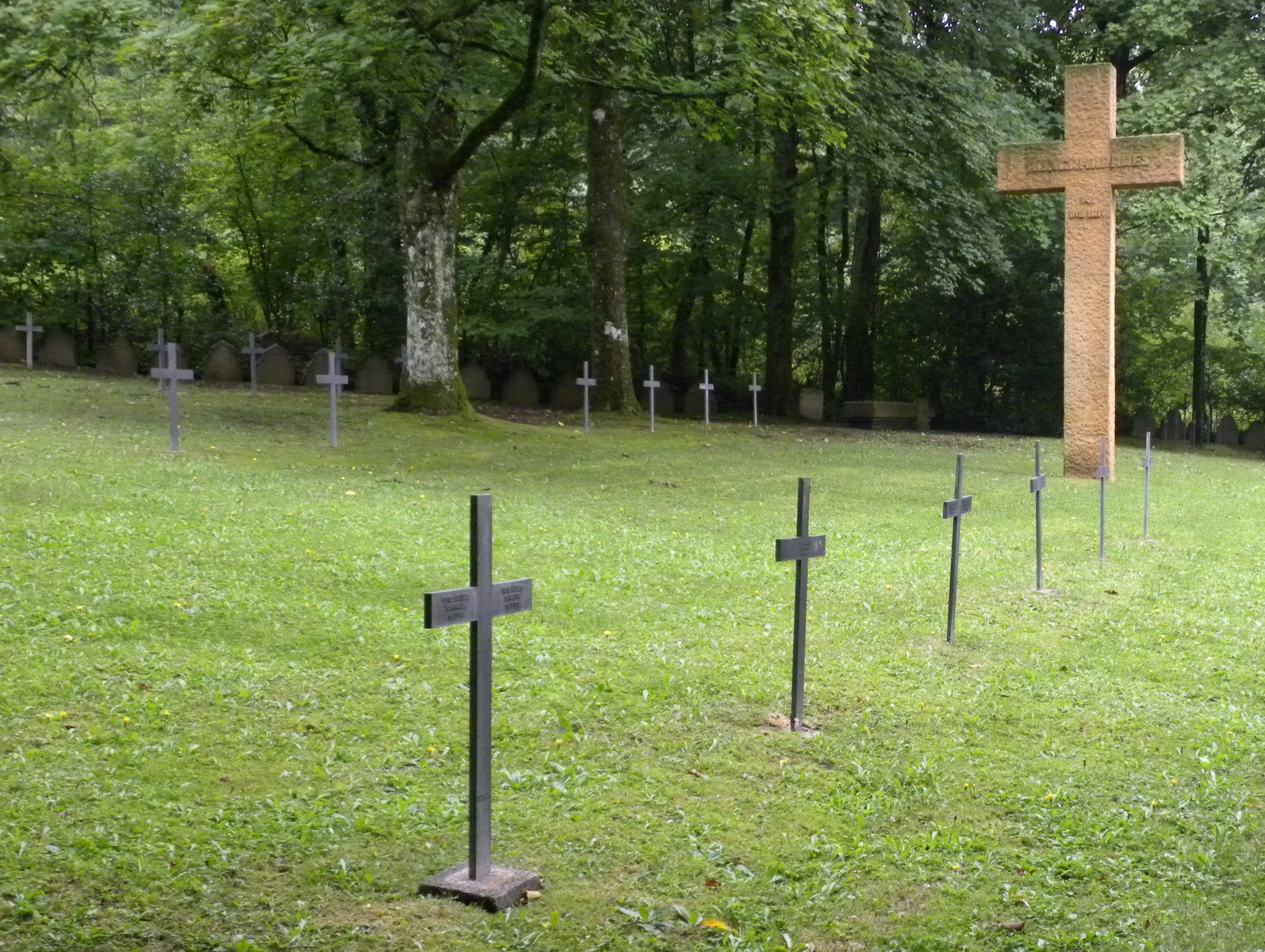
Small German cemetery on Meuse-Argonne battlefield.

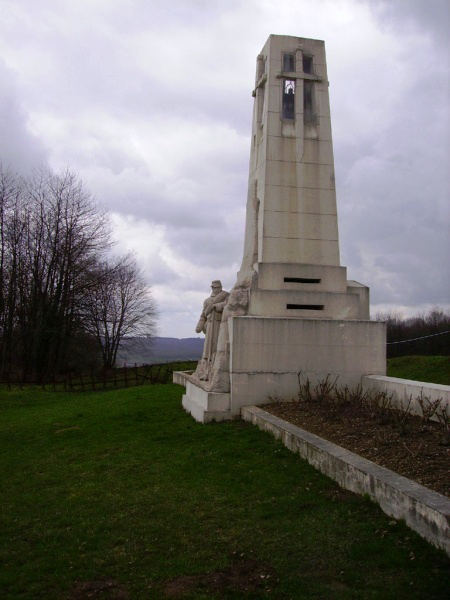
The monument at Vauquois shaped like a "Lantern of Death"

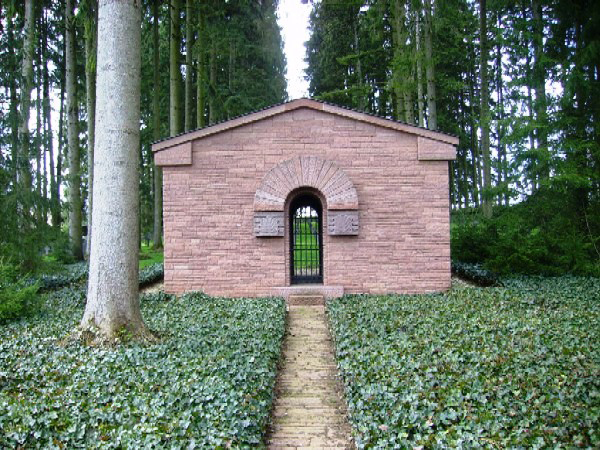
Entrance to German War Cemetery at Romagne-sous-Montfaucon.

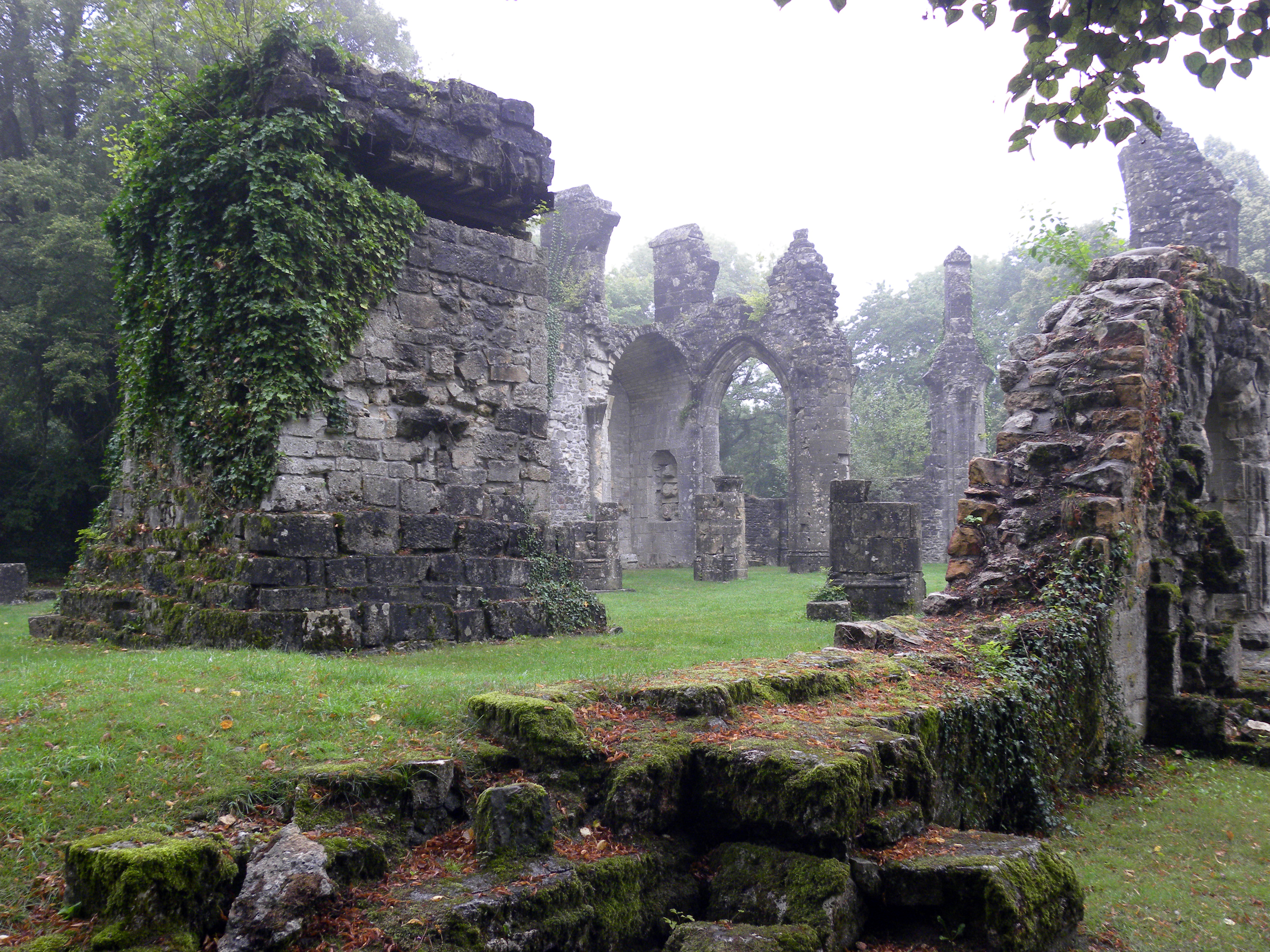
Ruined church at Montfaucon-d'Argonne directly behind the monument. The structure on the left is a German World War I observation post.

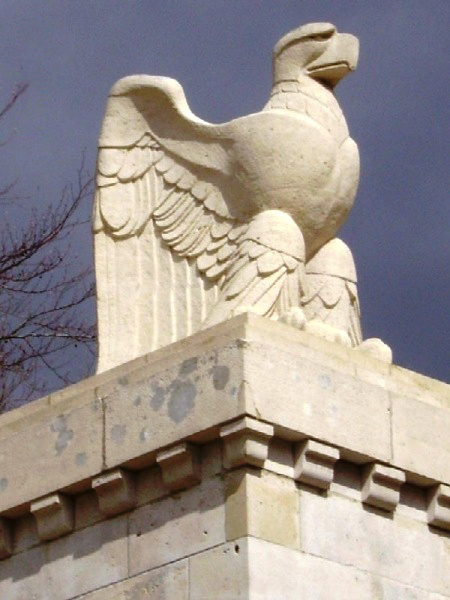
Eagle at entrance to the Meuse-Argonne American Cemetery.

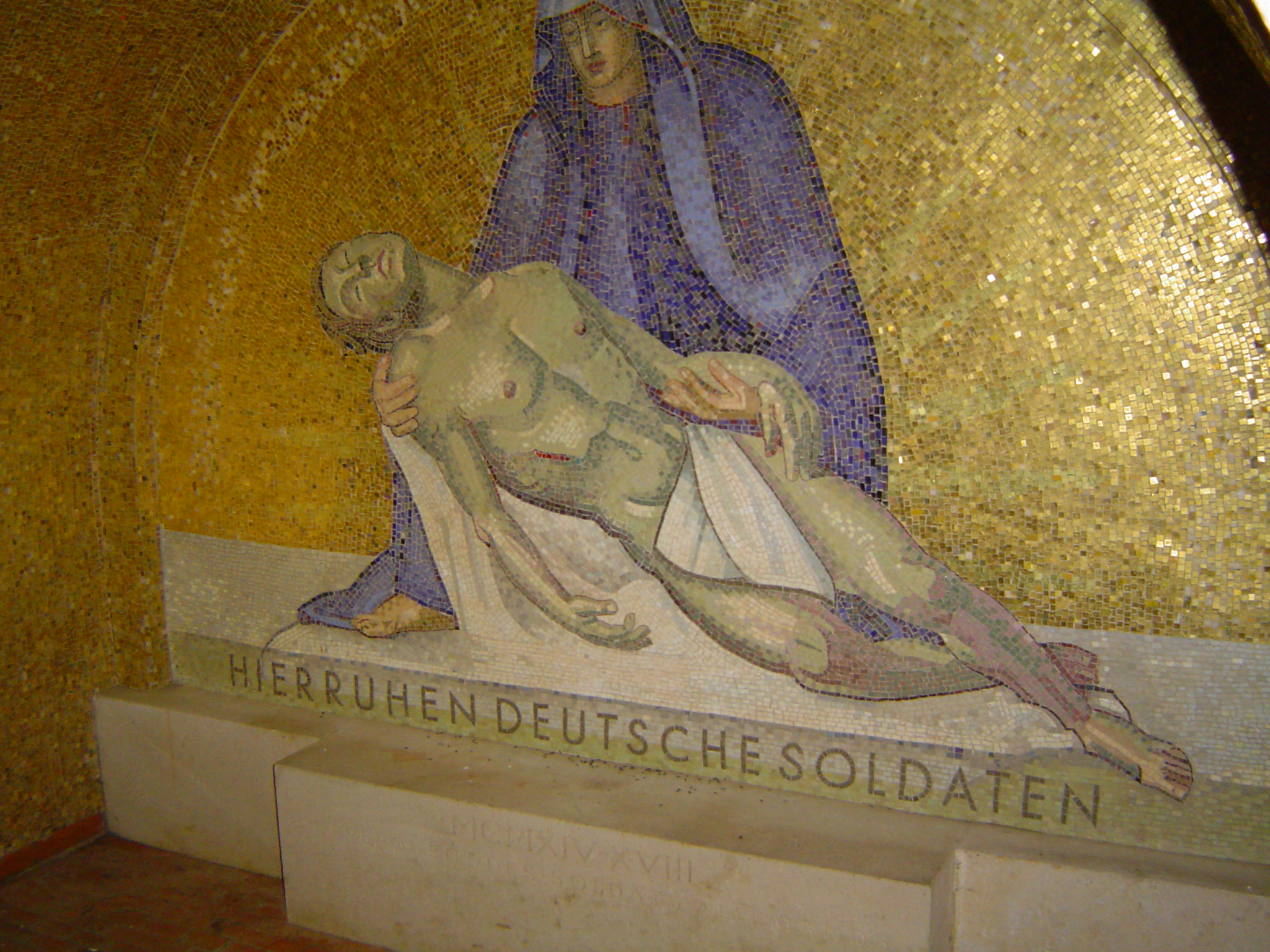
Pieta in mosaic in entrance to Romagne-sous-Montfaucon German War Cemetery.

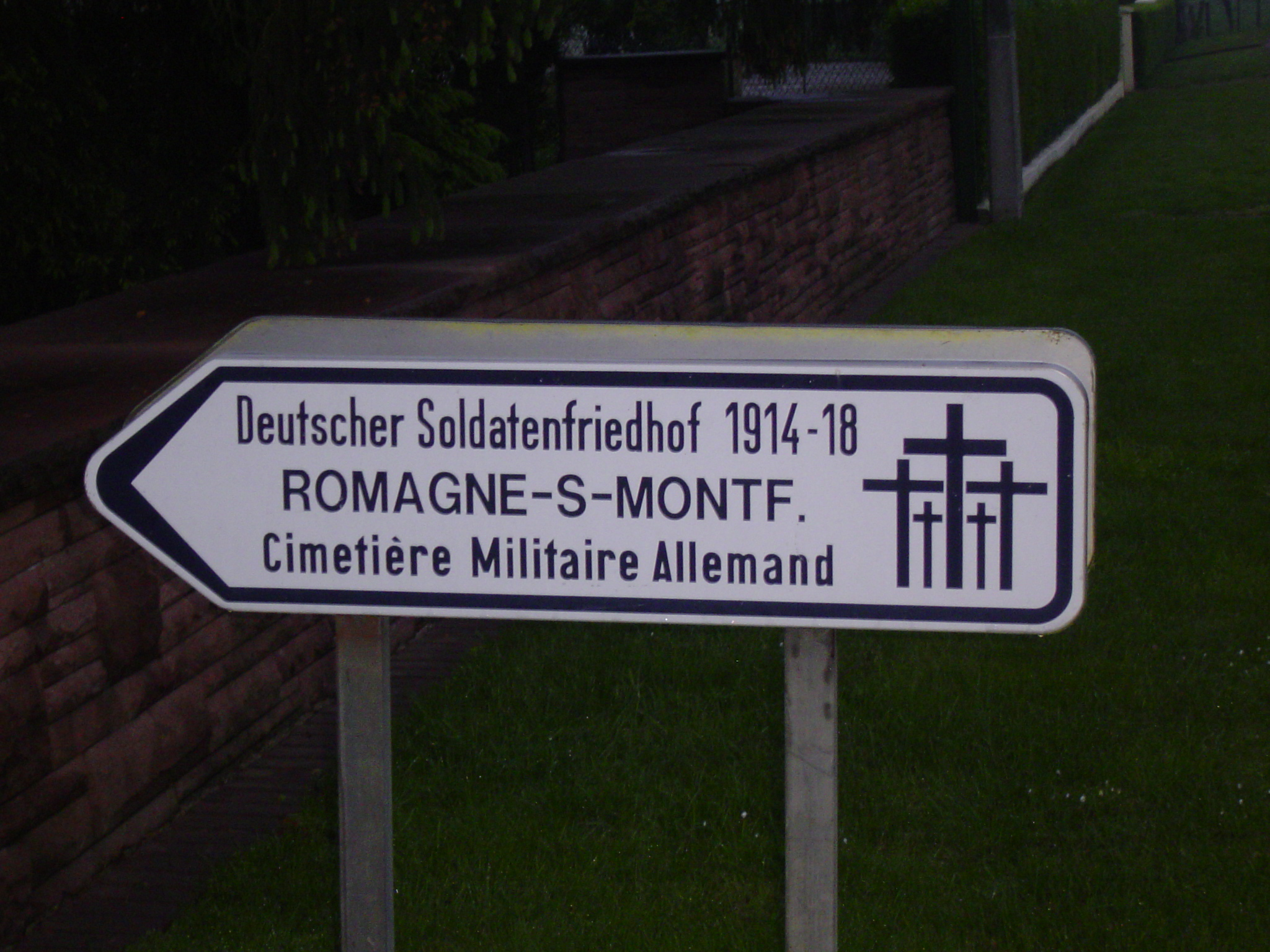
Distinctive sign seen throughout France and Belgium when indicating location of a German War Cemetery.

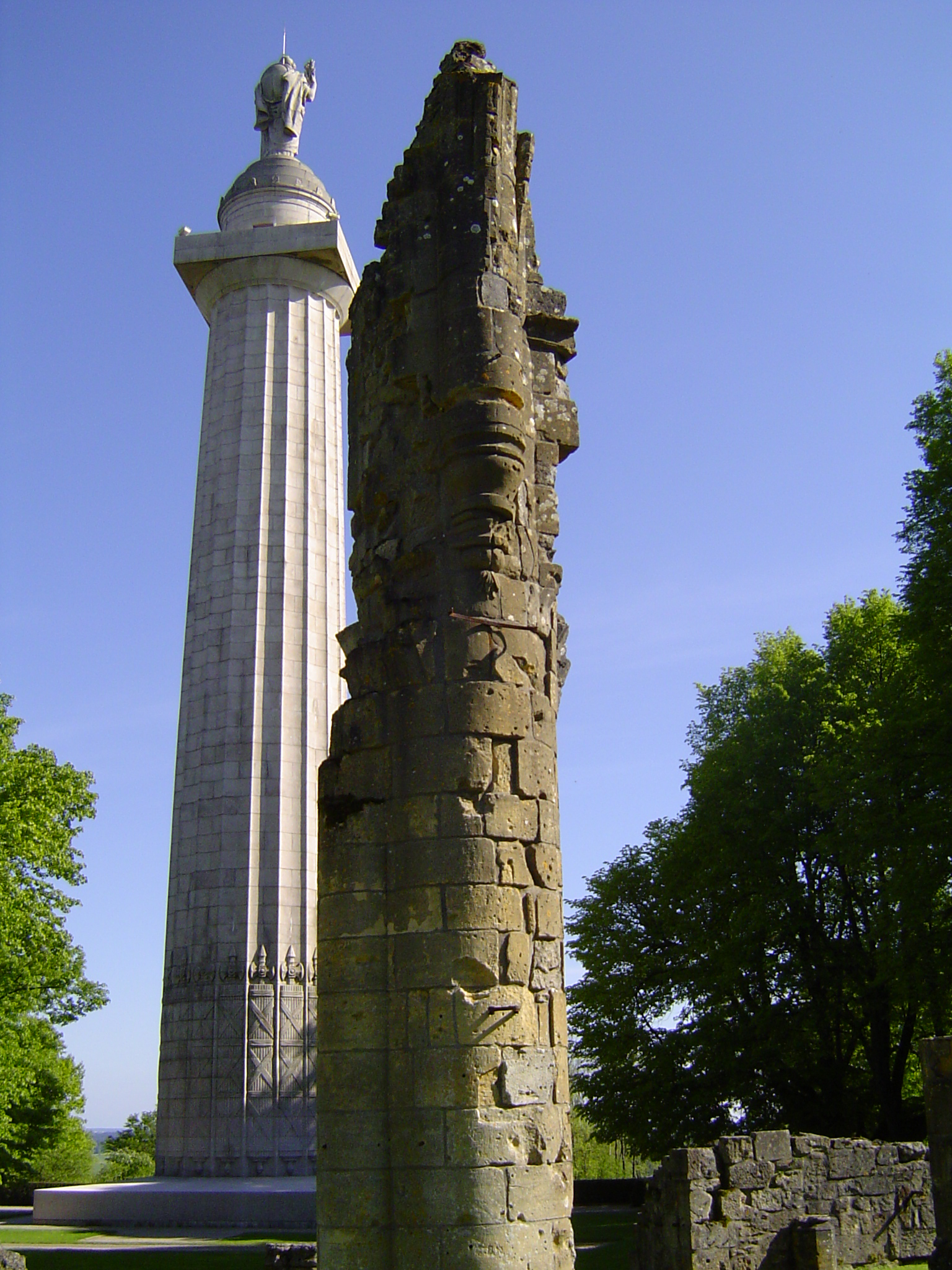
The Montfaucon column seen next to part of the nearby abbey ruins.

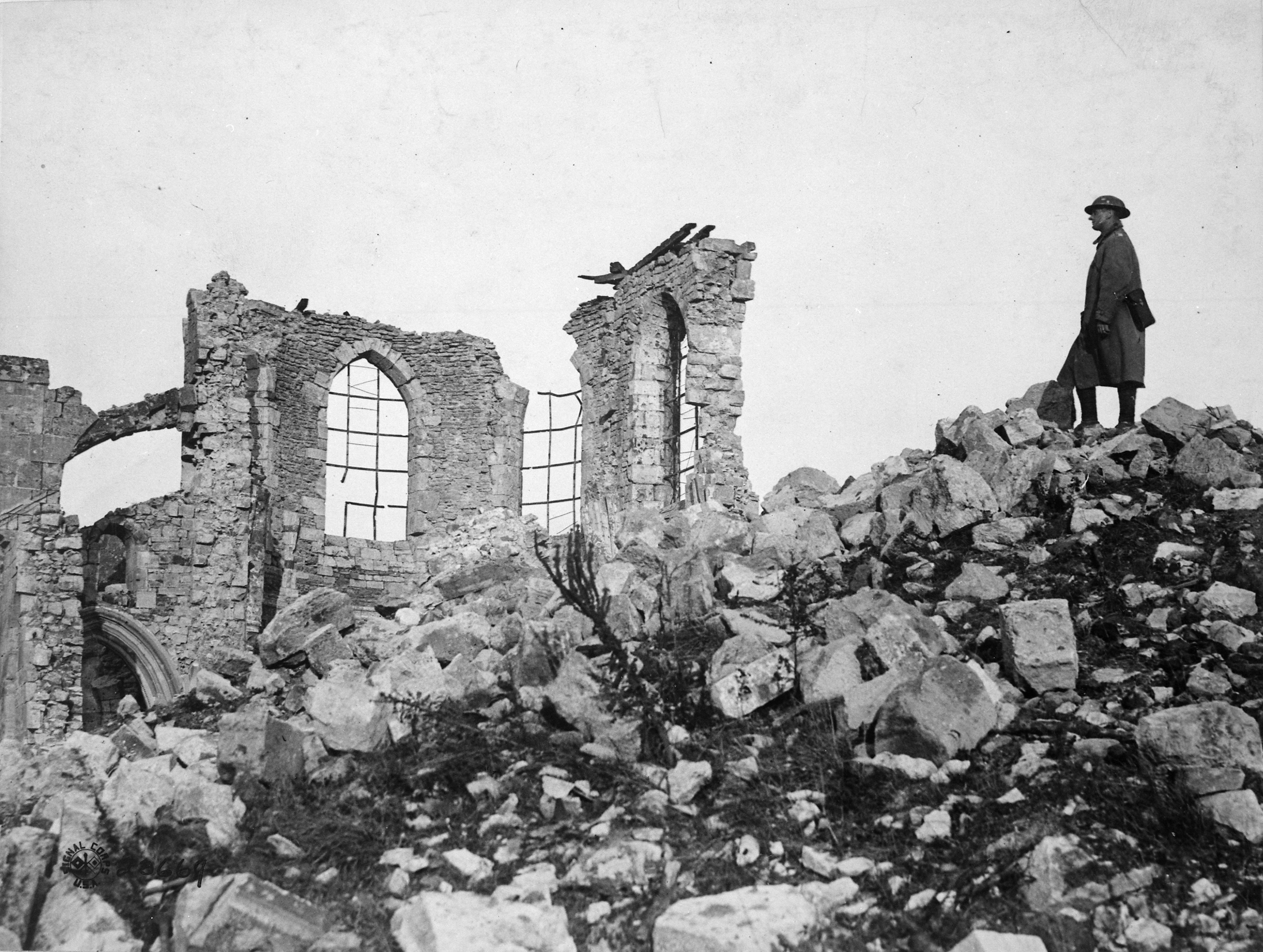

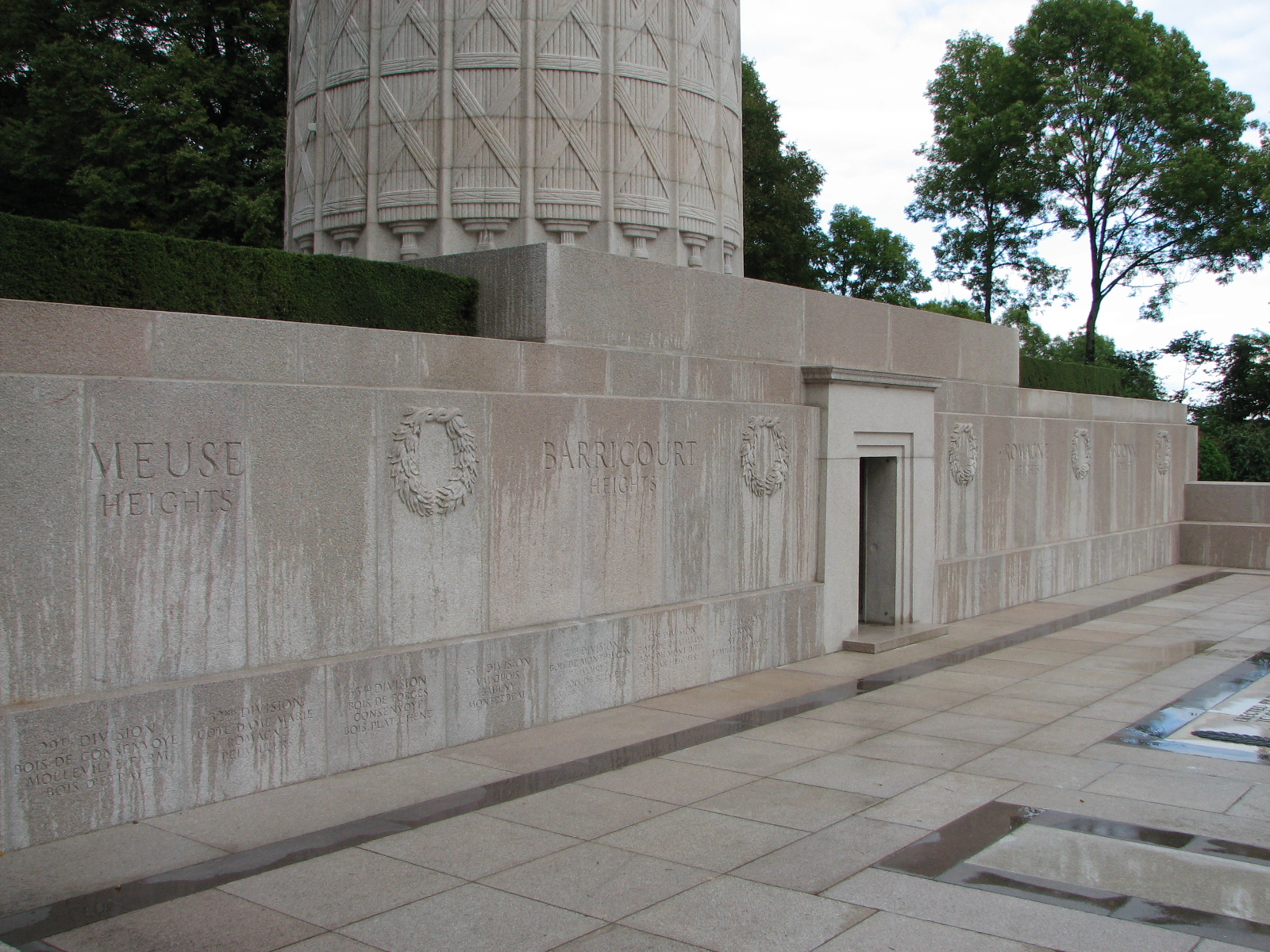
The base of the Montfaucon monument.

== See also ==
- List of World War I Memorials and Cemeteries in Alsace
- List of World War I memorials and cemeteries in Artois
- List of World War I memorials and cemeteries in Champagne-Ardennes
- List of World War I memorials and cemeteries in Flanders
- List of World War I Memorials and Cemeteries in Lorraine
- List of World War I memorials and cemeteries in the Somme
- List of World War I memorials and cemeteries in Verdun
- List of World War I memorials and cemeteries in the area of the St Mihiel salient
