= Montsec, Meuse =

Montsec
- Commune
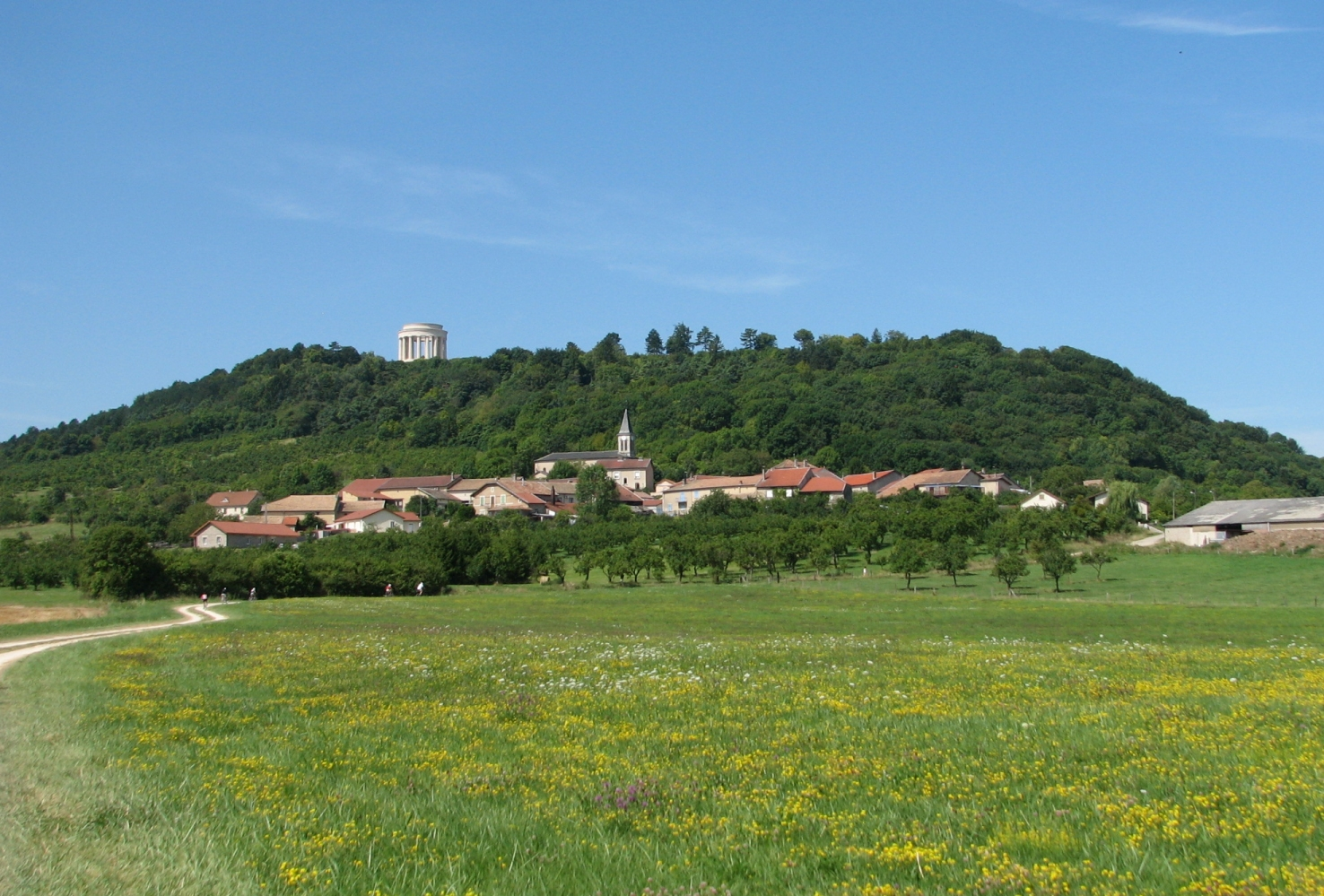
- A general view of Montsec

- Coat of arms
- Location of Montsec
- Location within France Location within Grand Est
- Coordinates: 48°53′29″N 5°43′16″E
- Country: France
- Region: Grand Est
- Department: Meuse
- Arrondissement: Commercy
- Canton: Saint-Mihiel
- Intercommunality: Côtes de Meuse Woëvre

Government
  - Mayor (2020–2026): Daniel Lombard
- Area^{1}: 5.95 km^{2} (2.30 sq mi)
- Elevation: 370 m (1,210 ft)
- Highest elevation: 376 m (1,234 ft)
- Lowest elevation: 226 m (741 ft)
- Population (2023): 75
  - Density: 13/km^{2} (33/sq mi)
- Time zone: UTC+01:00 (CET)
  - Summer (DST): UTC+02:00 (CEST)
- INSEE/Postal code: 55353 /55300
- ^{1} French Land Register data, which excludes lakes, ponds, glaciers > 1 km^{2} (0.386 sq mi or 247 acres) and river estuaries.

Montsec (French pronunciation: [mɔ̃sɛk]) is a commune in the Meuse department in Grand Est in north-eastern France. Fighting in World War I and World War II took place in and around Montsec. The Montsec American Monument was built here during the 1930s by the American Battle Monuments Commission. The monument, dedicated in 1937, commemorates the American forces who fought in the Battle of Saint-Mihiel in World War I.

== History ==
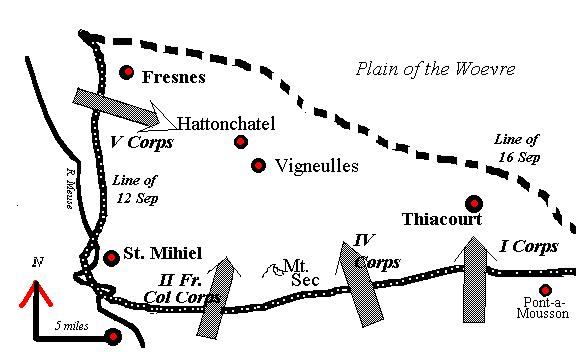
Map depicting Montsec during the Battle of Saint-Mihiel

During The Great War, also known as World War I, the village was occupied by the Germans in 1914 during the Battle of Flirey. A hill, sharing the same name, commands a view of the Woëvre Plain, and was used by German forces as a strong point and for observation.

During the Battle of Saint-Mihiel in 1918, the American 1st Division attacked in the area of Montsec, bypassing it. The 1st Division was joined by the American 26th Division, attacking on the other side of Montsec, also bypassing it. Both the 1st and 26th Divisions were able to accomplish it by a smoke screen being placed on the hill.

Having been bypassed due to it being fortified, being cut off from the rest of the German line, it fell to the Allies. This was accomplished by forces of the French 2nd Colonial Corps.

Before the Battle of Nancy, the commune was liberated by the American 317th Infantry in 1944.

== Montsec American Monument ==
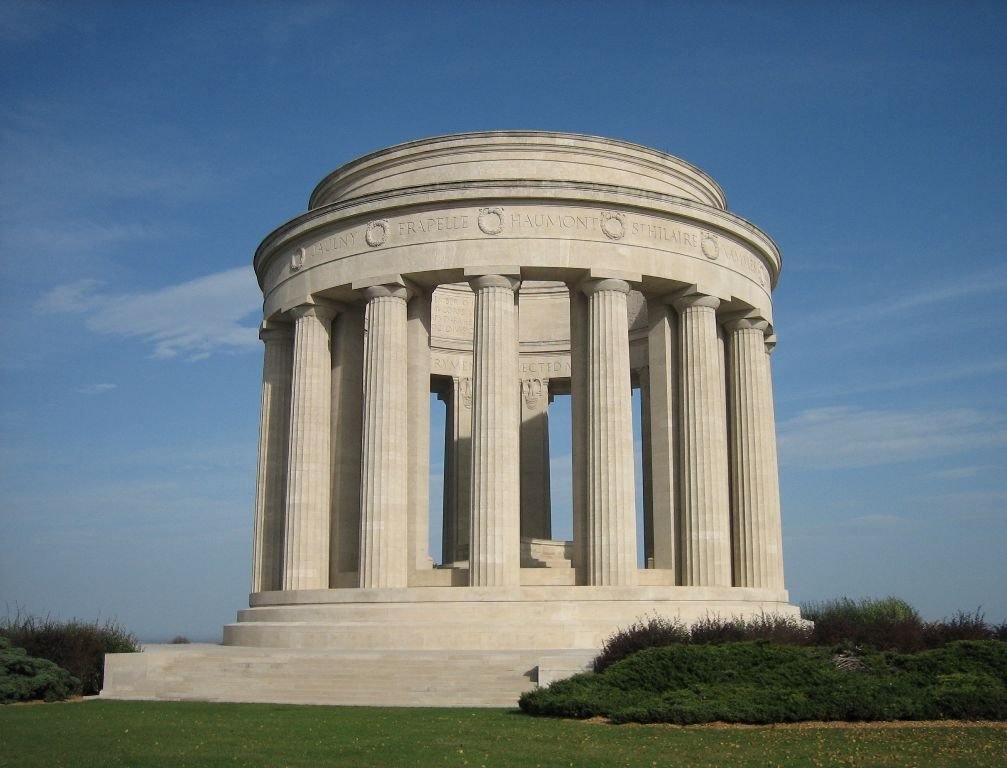
Monument to American soldiers at Montsec

The monument was designed by Egerton Swartwout, and has been described as a doric temple. It was built during the 1930s by the American Battle Monuments Commission; it was dedicated in 1937. The monument commemorates American forces involved in the Battle of Saint-Mihiel. These included the First and Second armies.

During World War II, German forces occupying France left the monument untouched. As American forces advanced, and began to displace the Germans, the memorial was damaged by American artillery. The monument was later restored.

It has been described as being similar to the Jefferson Memorial.

== See also ==
- Communes of the Meuse department
- List of World War I memorials and cemeteries in the area of the St Mihiel salient
- Parc naturel régional de Lorraine
