= List of World War I memorials and cemeteries in the area of the St Mihiel salient =

List of World War I memorials and cemeteries in the area of the Saint-Mihiel salient, in the present day Meuse department of the Lorraine region, located in northeastern France.

In this region the monuments and cemeteries are divided into: those linked to the efforts of the French to regain the ridge at Les Éparges, from 1915 to 1918; and those linked to the American offensive of the St Mihiel salient, the Battle of St Mihiel in September 1918.

== War Memorials and Cemeteries: Saint-Mihiel and the area of the St Mihiel salient ==
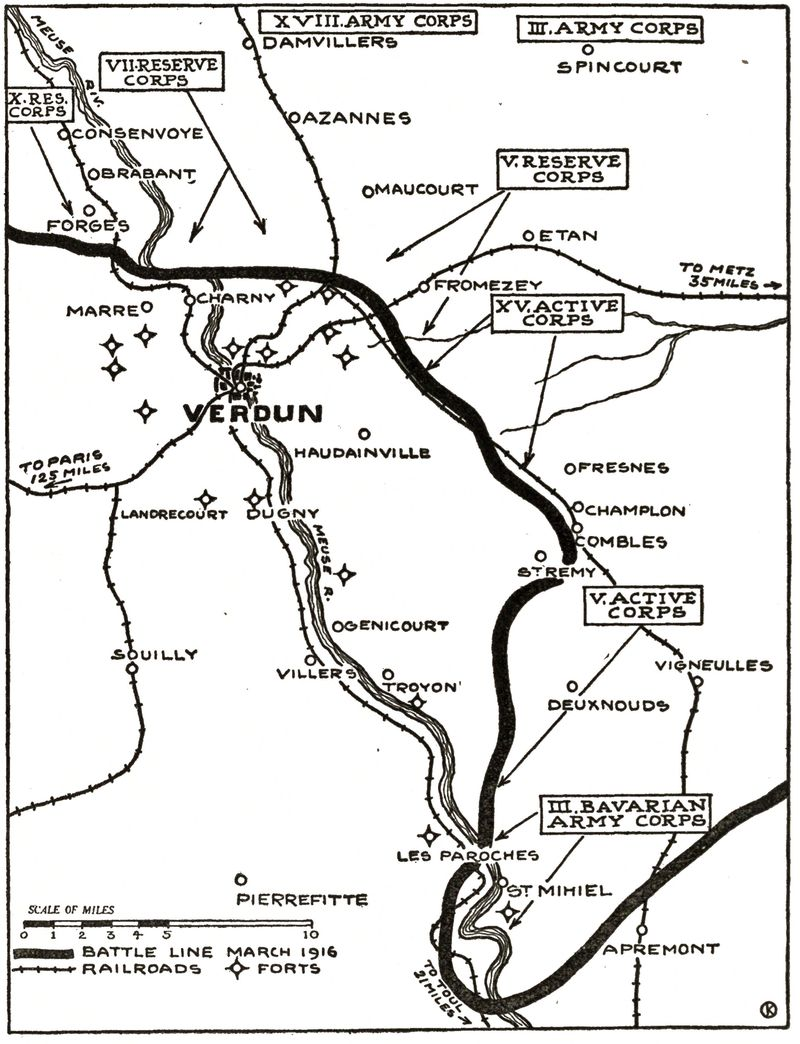
The western front between Verdun and St. Mihiel.
The red "x" shows the location of Les Éparges.

After the Battle of the Marne and on 13 September 1914, the 5th German Army went into retreat and retrenched east of Verdun on the Woëvre plain and at the foot of the "Heights of the Meuse" (the Hauts de Meuse). From here they intended to relaunch their offensive and reach the Meuse river. From 20 September, the Germans attacked on a line from Étain to Pont-à-Mousson and in several days had effectively created a bulge in the French line reaching as far as Saint-Mihiel, where they were halted by General Taverna's 16th Army Corps. What was to be known as the "St Mihiel Salient" was formed.

Part of the area taken by the Germans was the ridge or "Crête" at Les Éparges. This ridge was of great strategic importance because of the views in gave over the Woëvre plain and the French knew that they would never be able to retake the plain without first taking Hauts de Meuse and in particular the ridge at Les Éparges .

In the 1914-1918 war, the ridge at Les Éparges at 346 meters high was to serve as a counterpoint to the Butte de Vauquois. Both these areas of high ground served as eastern and western ends to the Verdun sector of the Western Front. Both were fought over fiercely and both were the scene of intensive mine warfare after head to head encounters produced no noticeable break through for either side.

== The Crête des Éparges and its memorials and monuments ==
The main French attempts to take the ridge were launched by General Joffre in 1915 and that year saw a series of French attacks, all fought with fierce intensity and resulting in much loss of life. The encounters embraced the Tranchée de Calonne, the woods of Chavalier and the wood at Brûlée. The ridge itself saw many bitter encounters and the terrain was soon changed for ever by the detonation of mines the digging of tunnels and constant artillery shelling.

From 5 to 14 April 1915, the 1st French Army under General Roques engaged the Germans on the ridge and the Woëvre plain but they were unable to take the ridge. At one point they advanced as far as "Point X", the furthest point east on the ridge and that giving the best views over the plain but they were soon forced back. The ridge was divided by the French into various areas gauged in their distance from the original French front line. Thus "Point A" was the nearest to the French trenches and "Point X" the furthest away. These attacks absorbed the attention of the entire French 1st Army and they lost the equivalent of an entire division – almost 18,000 men. It was no accident that Maurice Genevoix, the French novelist, was to call his narrative of the battle, "La Morte"- Death.

The trench fighting was not restricted to the Les Éparges ridge and south of St Mihiel there were encounters in the Ailly wood and that at Brûlée. Here the fighting involved General Bourges' 8th Army Corps.

Once the many encounters of 1915 had produced no major breakthrough for either side, the fighting on the surface was less intense and fighting moved underground and over the years of the war the ridge continued to be mined comprehensively from Point C to Point X. Now the fighting was to go underground to an even greater extent, with a war of tunnels and mines and in this period, 46 German mines and 32 French mines were detonated but still without producing any change in the front line.

In 1916, the waging of the Battle of Verdun saw the French withdraw voluntarily from the Woëvre plain area from 22 to 26 February and the French took up their main defensive position around the Fort at Moulainville which was bombarded by the German 420mm guns.

There was no great change to the front line in 1917 and it was only when the Americans attacked on 12 September 1918 that the salient was to again hear the roar of the guns and be finally freed from German occupation.

Today one can see many reminders of these encounters in the ridge's terrain and there are several monuments and memorials to mark the contributions of those who fought here and this list will identify and describe some of them

=== Monument to the 106th French Regiment of Infantry ===
Monument to the 106th French Regiment of Infantry
This monument, entitled "Les Revenants du 106e. R.I" ( a "revenant" could be translated as one who has gone missing) and dating to 1935, remembers the actions of the 106th French Infantry here at Les Éparges between September 1914 and April 1915. The monument carries the words

"Je Crois"

or "I believe".

It takes the form of a pyramid with a death mask at the top looking towards heaven and below and from a pile of skulls and bones, skeletal hands claw upwards towards the death mask. Given that many of those who died would have been buried alive in the many explosions and artillery bombardments, the sculptor creates a macabre suggestion of a corpse trying to escape from an enforced and unwanted tomb.

One attack here was made by the 106th on 17 February 1915, following the detonation of a huge mine. The Bavarian defenders withdrew from their first trench line when the attack began and then their artillery, knowing the exact coordinates of their old trench line, poured shellfire on to the French. The result was carnage and this bombardment, and a series of German counterattacks over the next few days, destroyed the regiment – the 106th lost 300 men killed, 300 men went missing and their bodies were never found and over 1,000 men were wounded. The misery was not over however and the regiment would be given reinforcements and sent to take part in the attempts to take Point X in March and April 1915. This monument is the work of the great French sculptor Maxime Real Del Sarte and at the base there is a bronze bas-relief by him which depicts a helmeted woman cradling a soldier in her arms, the work reminiscent of an ancient "Pieta". It will however be the death mask, the skulls and the upward reaching skeletal hands that will linger long in the mind.

The monument was erected in 1935 and on the left hand side there is a quotation taken from the writings of Maurice Genevoix

"VOUS QUI AVEZ PRIS VOTRE VIE A DEUX MAINS ET L'AVEZ PORTEE D'UN ELAN JUSQU'AUX LEVRES DE L'ENTONNOIR SOUS LES BALLES"

=== The Monument du Coq at Point C ===
The Monument du Coq at Point C
This monument is dedicated to the Reims-based 12th Division. It is the work of the Reims sculptor Lefèvre Klein. There are various plaques attached to the monument including the "Ordre du Corps d'Armee No.68" from General Herr. This finished with the stirring words

"Combattants des Éparges, vous avez inscrit une page glorieuse dans l'Histoire. La France vous en remercie"

There is also a plaque with the words of Army Order 147, this from General Roques.

The main inscription reads

"LA 12E DIVISION A SES MORTS ET A LEURS FRERES D'ARMES TOMBE AUX EPARGES"

The monument itself is an obelisk and is decorated with various bronze embellishments. These include a coq, the head of a soldier, a palm and grenades.

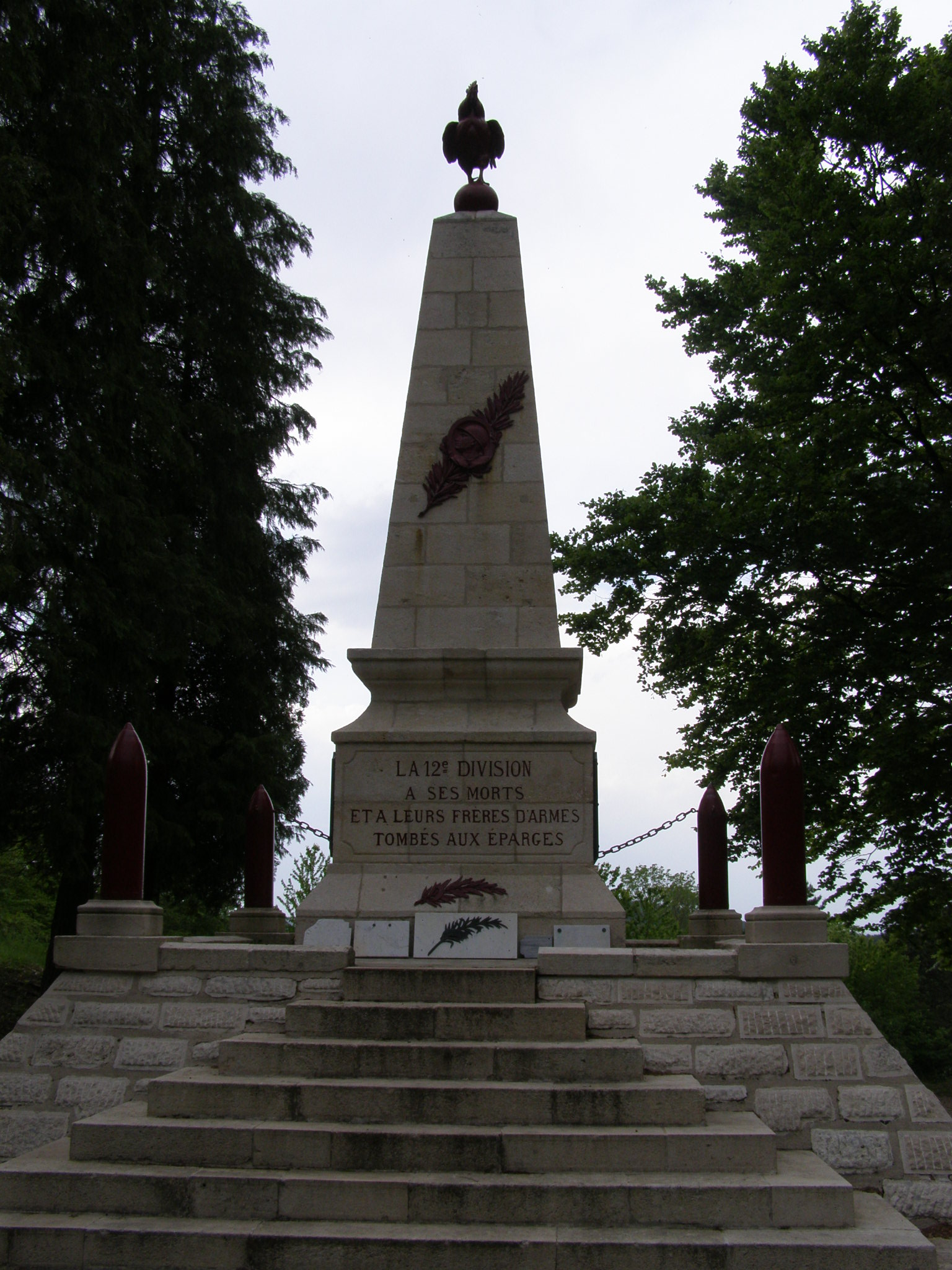
Monument du Coq.

=== Monument to the Engineers at Éparges ===
Monument to the Engineers at Éparges
This monument carries as its main inscription the words

"Érige par la Section de Metz de la Mutuelle des Anciens du Genie et des Transmissions de l'Est de la France Mai Oct.1963. Arch. E.Fagnoni. Metz"

and it is dedicated to all those French mining engineers who served in the 1914-1918 war. It is modern in design and the inscription on the left hand side of the wall reads

"A La Gloire du Genie"

and on the right is the emblem of the engineers.

The monument comprises a low semi-circular wall with the inscription at one end and the engineer's emblem at the other and in front of the wall are 7 granite columns each one representing an arm of the engineering fraternity; pontonniers, télégraphistes, électromécaniciens, sapeurs-mineurs, chemin de fer, artificiers and aérostiers. The designer of the monument was E.Fagnoni and it was erected in 1963, completion having been interrupted by the Second World War.

The inauguration took place on 20 October 1963, and the ceremony was led by Mr. Messmer, Minister of the Armed Forces, General Massu, the military governor of Metz, Mr.Sainteny, the Veterans Minister and Mr.Chazal, the Préfet of the Meuse..

=== The Monument du Point X- Monument to the Missing ===
The monument du Point X
The "Allée de la Comtesse de Cugnac" leads one to the Monument at "Point X". On one side are the words

"à ceux qui n'ont pas de tombe"

This translates as "to those who have no grave" and on one side there is a bas-relief which depicts an officer leading his men into battle and on the other side a cross above an altar. This was the work of the sculptor Fischer. The monument was commissioned by the Comtesse de Cugnac in honour of her fiancé and is dedicated to those men who have no known grave; the Missing. The monument situated at "Point X" looks out over the plain of Woëvre. Next to this monument there is a large map of the area laid on to a semi-circular pedestal. The Contessa de Cugnac and given funds to pay for the construction of the monument and the avenue leading to it. Point X was the furthest point to the east on the ridge and it was held by the Germans until taken by the U.S. Vth Division in September 1918.

=== Memorial to the 302nd French Infantry ===
Just by the Monument at Point X there is a small memorial to the soldiers of the 302nd who died fighting here from 20 September 1914 to 21 March 1915. It also covers the actions of the 102nd. The inscription reads

" "302e R.I. 20 Septembre 1914, 21 Mars 1915. Les Anciens des 302e et 102e R.I."

=== Croix des Carmes ===
Croix des Carmes
La Croix des Carmes was a wooden cross located near Bois-le-Prêtre, a village which had seen fighting in 1914 and 1915. In 1923, it was decided to erect a monument to those who had lain down their lives at Bois-le-Prêtre, this to replace the old cross. The monument was sculpted by Emile Just Bachelet and comprised a large cross raised up by two soldiers. One soldier wore the standard uniform of 1914 and the other the uniform of 1918. The inauguration took place on 23 September 1923, attended by Raymond Poincaré who had been the French president during the war.

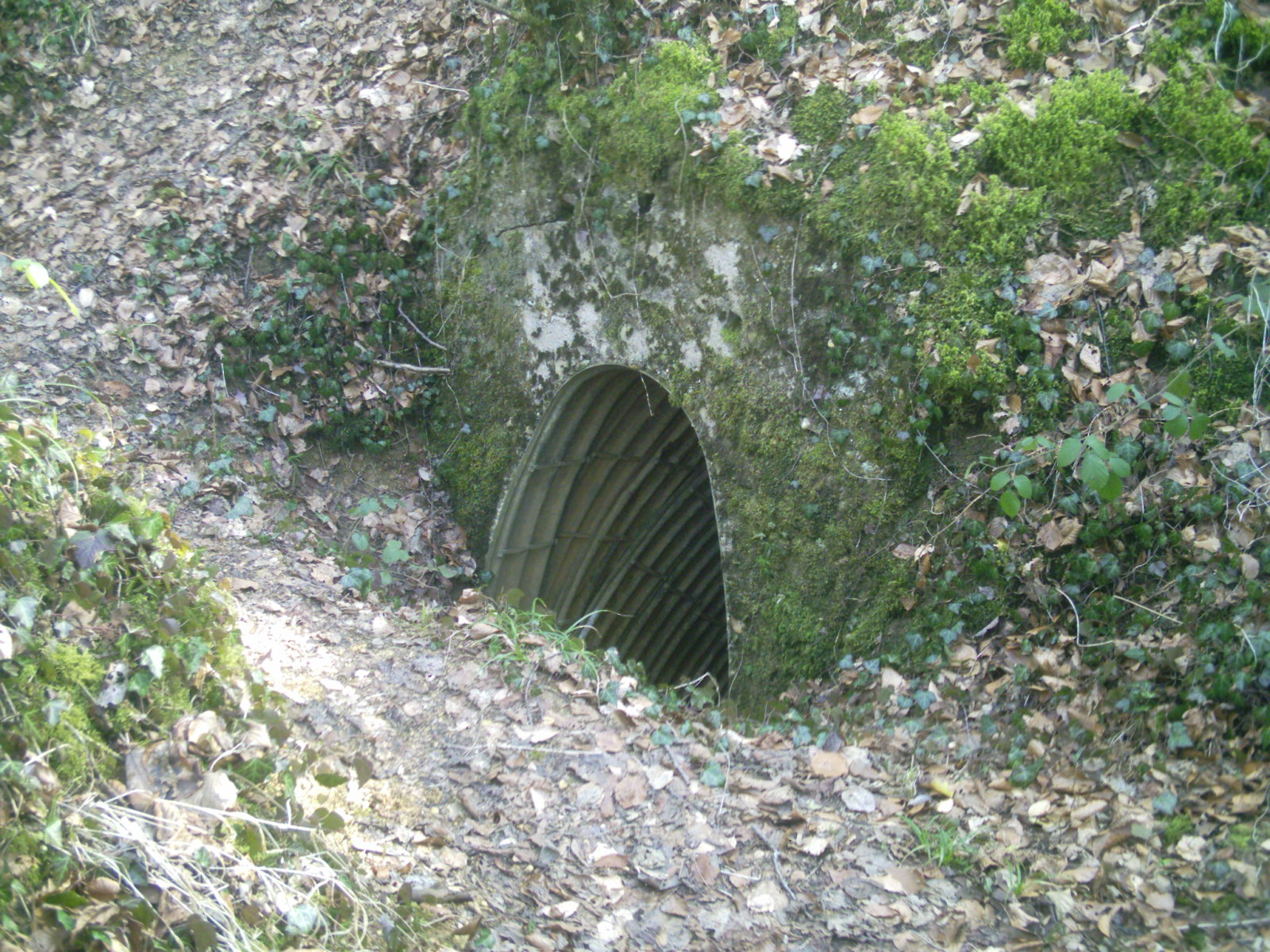
Sap to a trench at Croix des Charmes

=== Cemeteries in the Éparges ===
Cemeteries in the Éparges
The French National Cemetery of Le Trottoir is located at the foot of the Éparges Ridge and holds the graves of 2,108 soldiers and an ossuary containing the remains of 852 men. It was created in 1915 following the fighting on the Hauts de Meuse. There are many other French cemeteries in the area.

There is a German cemetery at Saint-Maurice-sous-les-Côtes containing 1,387 graves and the remains of 402 soldiers laid to rest in an ossuary, another at Viéville-sous-les-Côtes, this holding 1,044 graves with 135 men laid to rest in an ossuary and at Troyon-Vaux-les-Palameix which holds 2,655 graves and an ossuary holding the remains of 135 men.

=== Memorial to Alain Fornier and companions ===
Memorial to Alain Fornier and companions
On 22 September 1914, the young author Alain Fournier – the writer of the novel "Le Grand Meaulnes" – and twenty comrades of the 288th French Infantry disappeared. Fournier had been a tutor to T. S. Eliot and friend to Charles Peguy, another young French writer who would die in September 1914.

Fournier's body was not discovered until the 1990s. It is thought that he and the others lying in a mass grave alongside him were shot in reprisal for their shooting at a German ambulance company. Fournier and his companions are buried today in the nearby French military cemetery at St Remy-la-Calonne.

=== The Fort at Troyon ===
The Fort at Troyon
The fort at Troyon was built between 1878 and 1879 as part of the defensive line between Nancy and Verdun. It was designed by Séré de Rivières and is unusually made entirely from bricks, not concrete. The fort successfully resisted the German attacks in September 1914 and so protected the rear flank of the French troops taking part in the Battle of the Marne and saved Verdun from being surrounded and taken. Some 450 soldiers had held on for 6 days against heavy Austro-German artillery fire and a division of the German 5th Army. It was the only fort along the line from Verdun to Toul that did not fall into German hands. The Troyon Fort lay forgotten for 80 years, but is now looked after by the "Ceux de Troyon" Association. In 1916, a small obelisk was erected in memory of those who defended the fort and in 1918 the Fort at Troyon served as a hospital for American soldiers fighting to liberate Saint Mihiel and to take Mount Montsec.

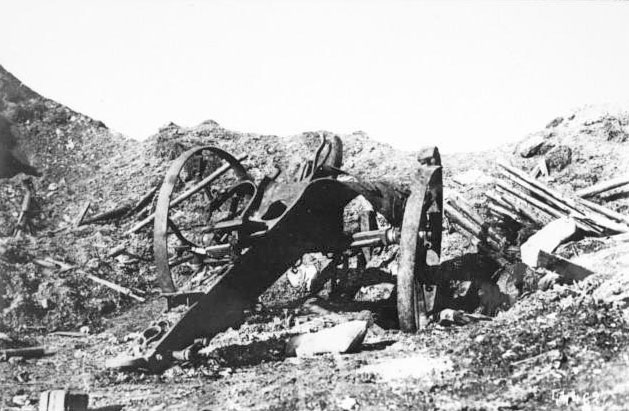
1915/A French gun lies in the ruins of the Fort

=== Fort de Liouville ===
Fort de Liouville
In 1870, France was partly occupied by the Prussian army as a result of the latter's victory in the Franco-Prussian war. As a result of this defeat, the Séré de Rivières system of fortifications was planned and various forts were constructed to defend the nation and the fort at Liouville was one such fortification. The fort dominates the Woëvre valley and blocks the Marbotte and Lérouville gaps in the Hauts de Meuse, watching over the rail line to Lérouville. The fort was bombarded by German artillery for a large portion of the war, with the heaviest fire between 22 September and 16 October 1914. The 'Fort de Liouville was also known as Fort Stengel and is located between the communes of Saint-Agnant-sous-les-Côtes and Saint-Julien-sous-les-Côtes, near the town of Commercy in the Meuse.

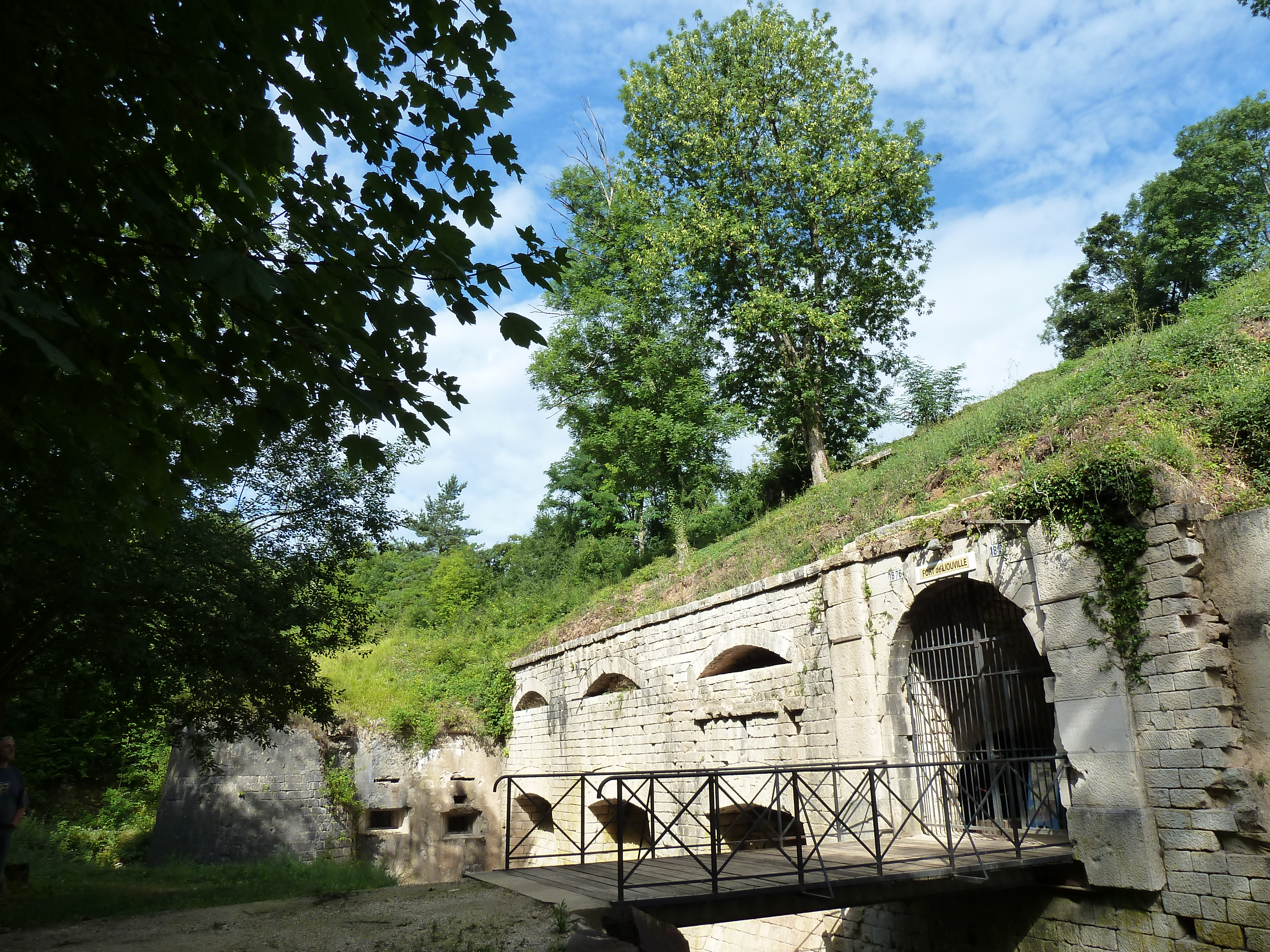
Entrance to the Fort de Liouville

== The Saint-Mihiel salient. The American Offensive of 1918 and the Monuments and Cemeteries linked to it ==
When the German armies launched their five great offensives of 1918, the Allies realised that the situation was perilous and that the arrival of the American troops was now crucial but when these troops began to reach France, General John. J. Pershing, the Commander-in-Chief of the American Expeditionary Forces, was reluctant to allow his men to be rushed into action and used piecemeal but wanted to concentrate on consolidation and acclimatisation and getting his men organised as an effective fighting units. He did however release to French control some of his troops when the German third and fifth offensives put the French Army under great pressure and these contributions and the efforts of the units involved are recorded at the Aisne-Marne American Cemetery and on the Chateau-Thierry Monument.

Once the success of the Second Battle of the Marne had seen the German Army retreating, the Allied Command were determined to keep the Germans on the back foot and several major offensives were planned at an Allied conference on 24 July. 1918. The British and French forces were allocated the sector around Amiens and the St Mihiel sector was allocated to the Americans. This salient projected roughly 16 miles into the Allied line and ran from Verdun in the north, south to St Mihiel and then east to Pont-a-Mousson on the Moselle River. The area was bordered by a line of hills known as the Heights of the Meuse and a succession of marshes and lakes situated across deep ravines and dense forests. The salient also protected the strategic rail centre of Metz and the Briey iron basin, a rich source for the Germans of raw material for munitions production. It also constituted an ongoing threat to Verdun and Nancy. It was essential that the salient be reduced before any larger offensive be launched against Metz or Briery or in the Argonne sector further north which had also been allocated to the Americans.

On 30 August, the U.S.First Army was asked to limit its efforts to the reduction of the salient so that very soon after it could undertake the larger task presented in the Meuse/Argonne area.

The St. Mihiel offensive began on 12 September with a threefold assault on the salient. The main attack was made against the south face by two American corps. The First Corps was on the right(from right to left the 82nd, 90th, 5th, and 2nd Divisions in line with the 78th in reserve) and covered a front from Pont-à-Mousson on the Moselle, westward to Limey, while on the left, the Fourth Corps (from right to left the 89th, 42nd, and 1st Divisions in line with the 3rd in reserve) extended along a front from Limey westward to Marvoisin. A secondary thrust was carried out against the west face of the salient along the Heights of the Meuse, from Mouilly north to Haudimont, by the Fifth Corps (from right to left the 26th Division, the French 15th Colonial Division, and the 8th Brigade, 4th Division in line with the rest of the 4th in reserve). A holding attack against the apex, to keep the enemy in the salient, was made by the French II Colonial Corps (from right to left the French 39th Colonial Division, the French 26th Division, and the French 2d Cavalry Division in line). In the First Army reserve were the American 35th, 80th, and 91st Divisions. The Allies also mobilized 1,481 aircraft to provide air superiority and close air support over the front.

Defending the salient was German "Army Detachment C", consisting of eight divisions and a brigade in the line and about two divisions in reserve. The Germans had begun a step-by-step withdrawal from the salient the day before.

By 16 September, the salient was eliminated and now the Americans would need to move their focus to the Meuse-Argonne.

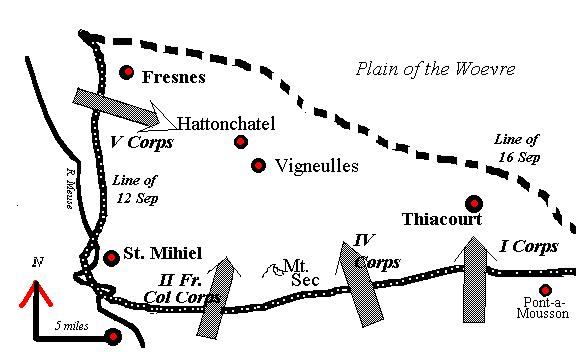
Map of St Mihiel Battle

=== The Montsec Monument ===
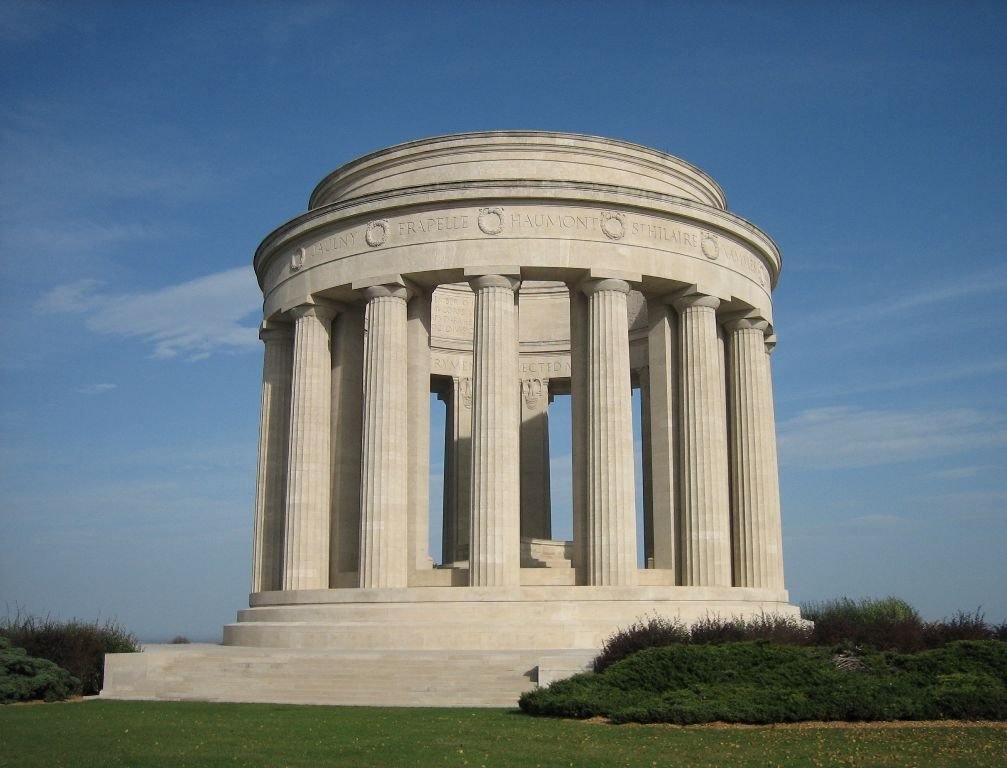
Montsec

The Montsec Monument
This monument in Euville stone was erected in 1932 on the Butte de Montsec which offers a magnificent, wide panorama over the Madine Lake and the Côtes de Meuses. The monument celebrates the capture of the St Mihiel salient by the American First Army, the operations of the American Second Army from 9 to 11 November 1918 and other combat services of American divisions both in this region and in Alsace and Lorraine. The monument consists of a large circular colonnade at the centre of which, on a raised platform, is a bronze relief map of the St.Mihiel Salient. On the right side of a flight of steps leading to the monument is engraved

"This monument has been erected by the United States of America to commemorate the capture of the St Mihiel Salient by the troops of her First Army and to record the services of the American Expeditionary Forces on the battlefront in this region and elsewhere in Lorraine and in Alsace. It stands as a lasting symbol of the friendship and cooperation between the French and American armies."

The same inscription is repeated in French on the left side of the flight of steps and near the top of the monument and on the outside lintel are engraved the names of villages and towns where battles were fought in this region

"THIAUCOURT – VIGNEULLES – FRESNES – VIEVILE – ST. BENOIT – NORROY – BENEY – JAULNY – FRAPELLE – HAUMONT – ST. HILAIRE – XAMMES – NONSARD – VILCEY – ST. BAUSSANT – VANDIERES."

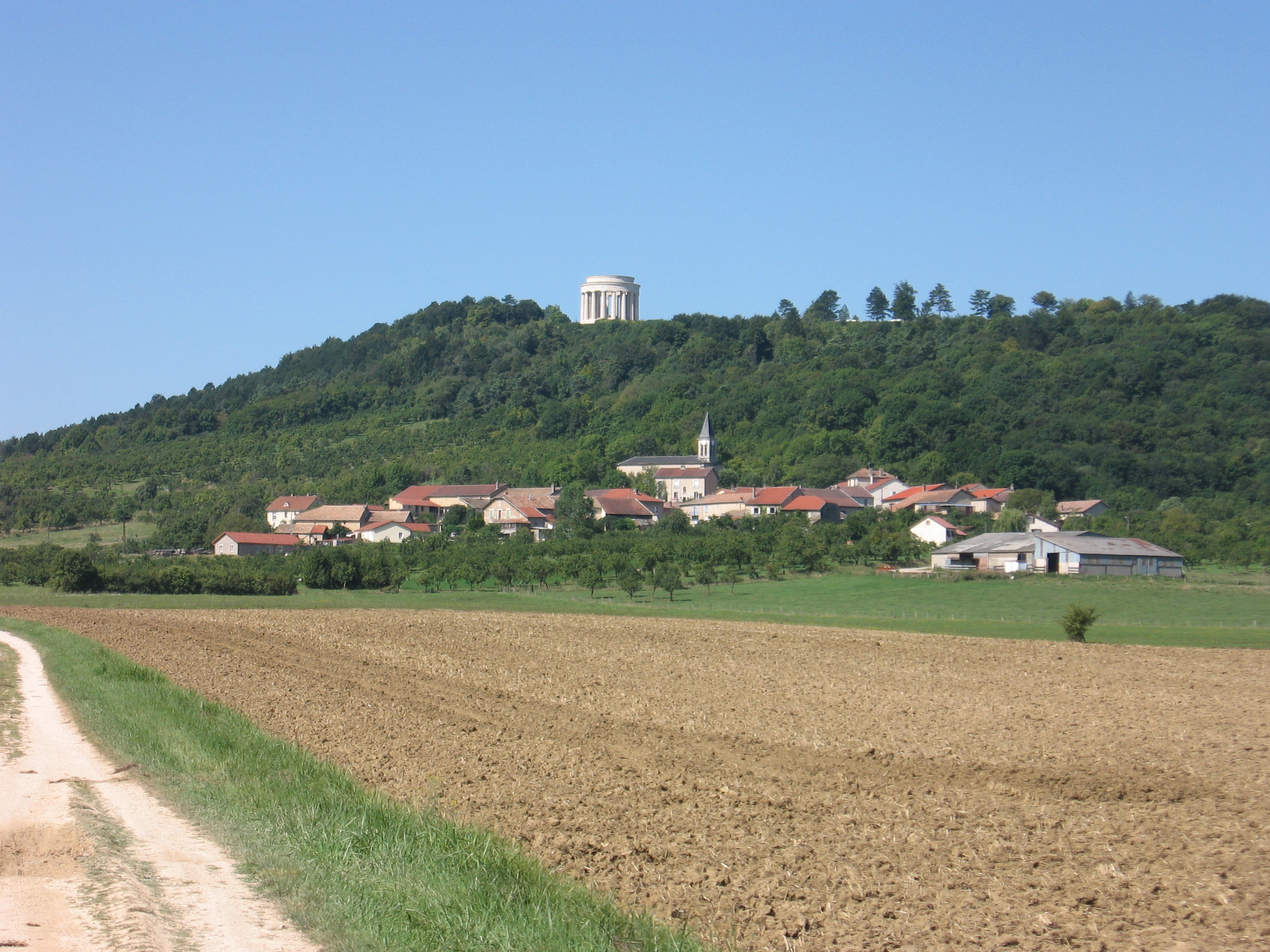
View of the Butte at Montsec with the monument seen at the top

=== St Mihiel American Cemetery and Memorial ===
St Mihiel American Cemetery and Memorial
The cemetery is located at the western edge of Thiaucourt-Regniéville and covers an area of 40.1/2 acres. It sits in the centre of what was the St Mihiel salient and the majority of the 4,153 soldiers buried here were killed in the capture of the salient. It is the third largest of the eight permanent World War I American military cemeteries. It is run by the American Battle Monuments Commission to whom administration was passed in 1934. The buildings in the cemetery are made from Euville limestone and the architects used were Thomas Harlan Ellett of New York. At the intersection of the central mall and transverse axis in the centre of the cemetery is a large sundial on which sits an eagle gnomon and the shadow cast by the eagle gnomon in relation to the lead Roman numerals set in the flat surface of the base indicates the time of day. Around the sundial's circular base is inscribed

"Time will not dim the glory of their deeds"

At the west end of the transverse axis is a sculptured stone figure of a young American officer. It is the work of the New York sculptor Paul Manship. The soldier stands in his field uniform with his trench helmet held in his hand. He carries side arms and a map case and above his head are the words

"”IL DORT/LOIN DES SIENS/DANS LA DOUCE/TERRE DE FRANCE."

. (Translation:" He sleeps far from his family in the gentle land of France.") On the pedestal below him are the words

”Blessed are they that have the home longing for they shall go home"

At the centre of the peristyle is a large rose-granite urn similar to an ancient funereal vase. The winged horse Pegasus is one of the vase's decorative features.

There is also a small museum and on the side walls are black marble panels, and at the top of each panel is written

"In memory of those American soldiers who fought in this region and who sleep in unknown graves. Listed below are the names of the 284 American soldiers who gave their lives in this area, but whose remains were not recovered or identified."

=== The Massachusetts Monument at Apremont-la-Forêt ===
The Massachusetts Monument at Apremont-la-Forêt
A charming water fountain can be seen in Apremont-la-Foret. It was given by the town of Holyoke in Massachusetts in memory of the American soldiers who fell in Apremont-La-Foret in 1918. See photograph in gallery.

=== Franco-American Monument at Flirey ===
In the village of Flirey is this monument celebrating the joint Franco-American action which took place in 1918.

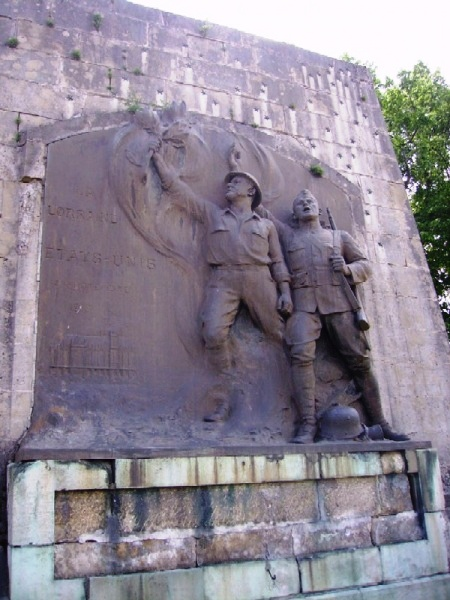
Franco-American Monument at Flirey

=== Memorial to the 1631st Regiment of Infantry at Flirey ===
Memorial to the 1631st Regiment of Infantry at Flirey
On the opposite side of the road to the Franco-American Memorial at Flirey is the monument shown below celebrating the efforts of the 1631st Regiment of Infantry.

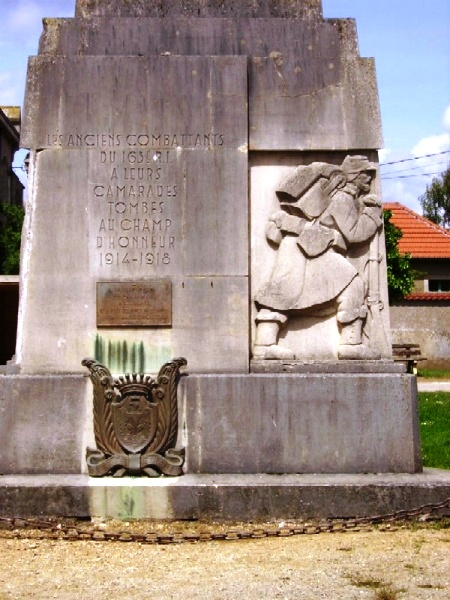

=== Literary associations ===
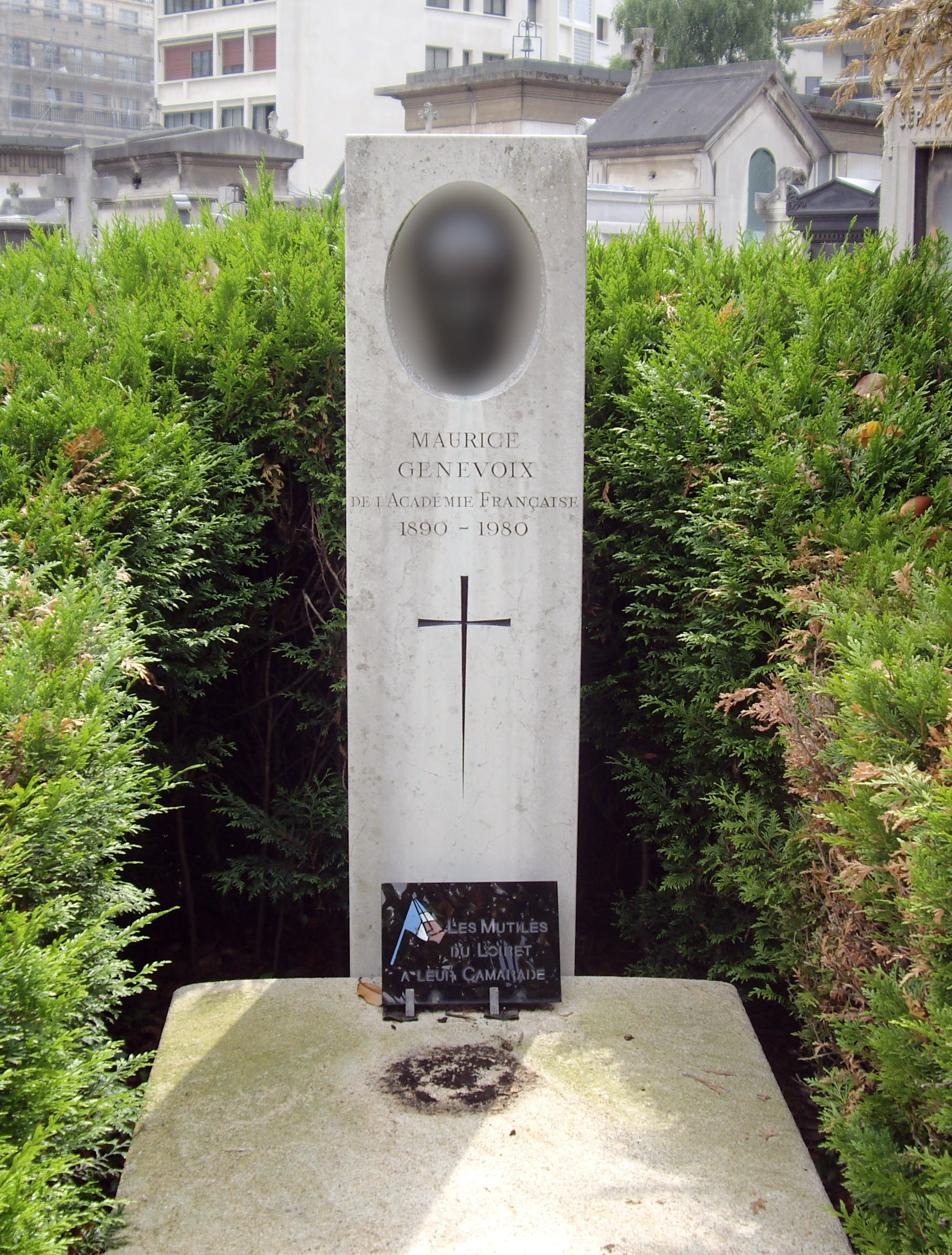
Tomb of Maurice Genevoix in the cemetery at Passy, Paris 16e.

This area of the Western Front has many literary associations. These include:-

- Alain-Fournier served with the 288th Infantry and disappeared fighting in the Eparges. In 1991, his body was found in a communal German grave not far from the Tranchée de Calonne.
- Ernst Jünger the German writer fought while serving in the 76th at Éparges and was wounded. He describes his experience in Orages d'acier.
- Maurice Genevoix was an officer in the 7th company of the 106th Infantry which fought on the ridge at Éparges. He wrote of his experiences in five books: Sous Verdun, Nuit de guerre, Au seuil des guitounes, La Boue and Les Éparges. These were condensed into one book titled Ceux de 14.

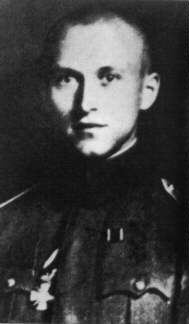
Ernst Jünger (29 March 1895 – 17 February 1998).

== Gallery of Images ==
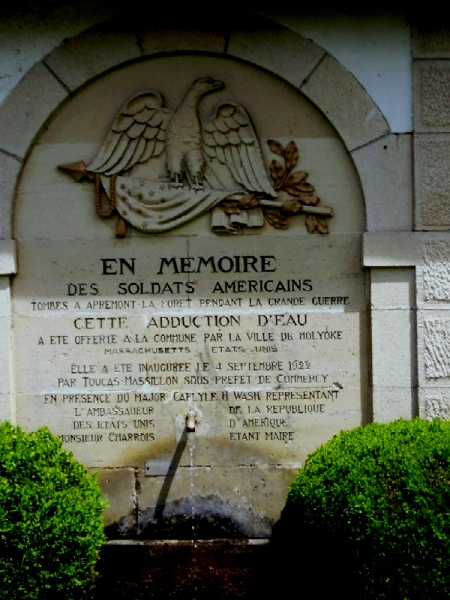
Fountain in Apremont dedicated to American soldiers

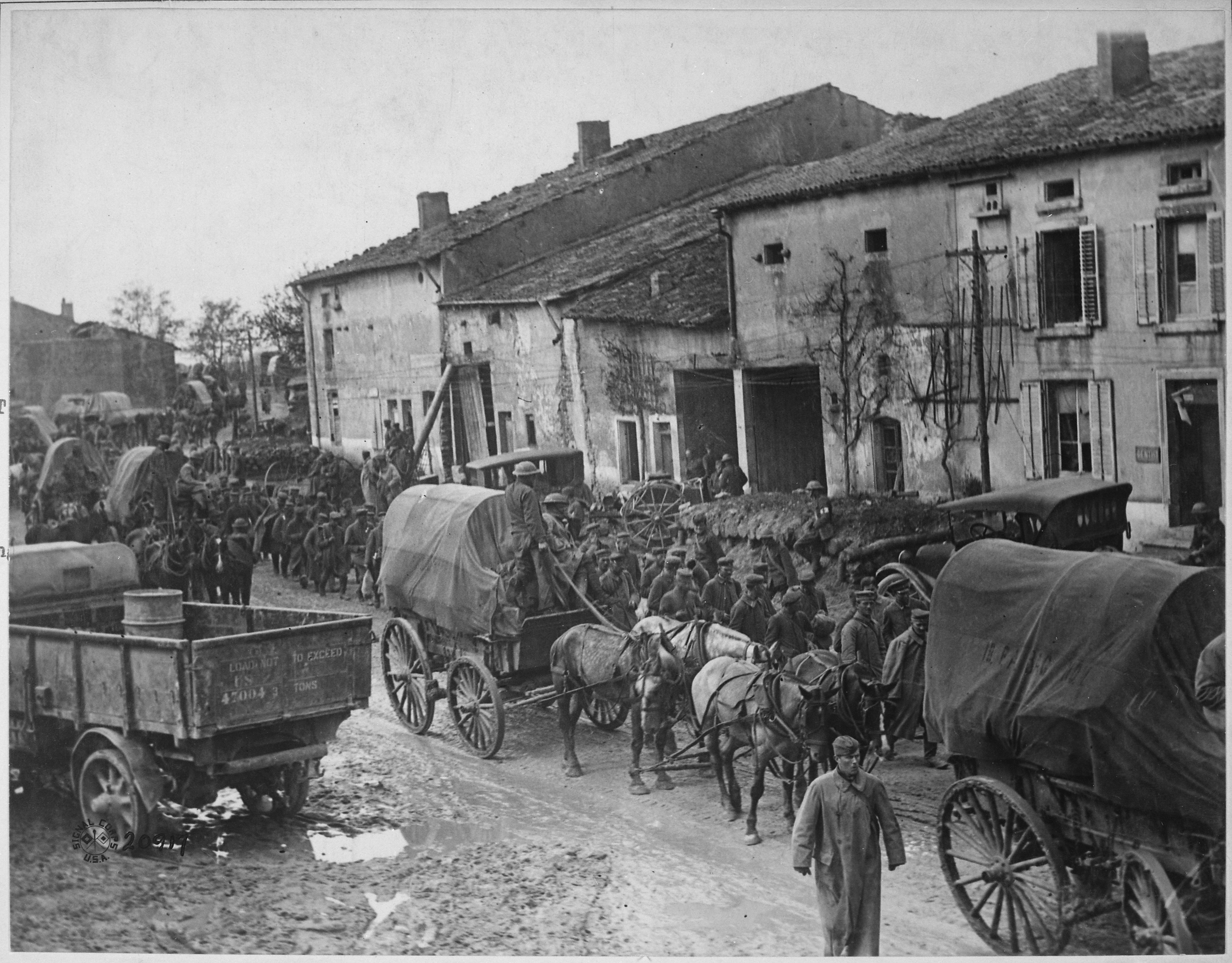
Columns of German prisoners taken by the Americans in the first day of the assault on the St. Mihiel salient

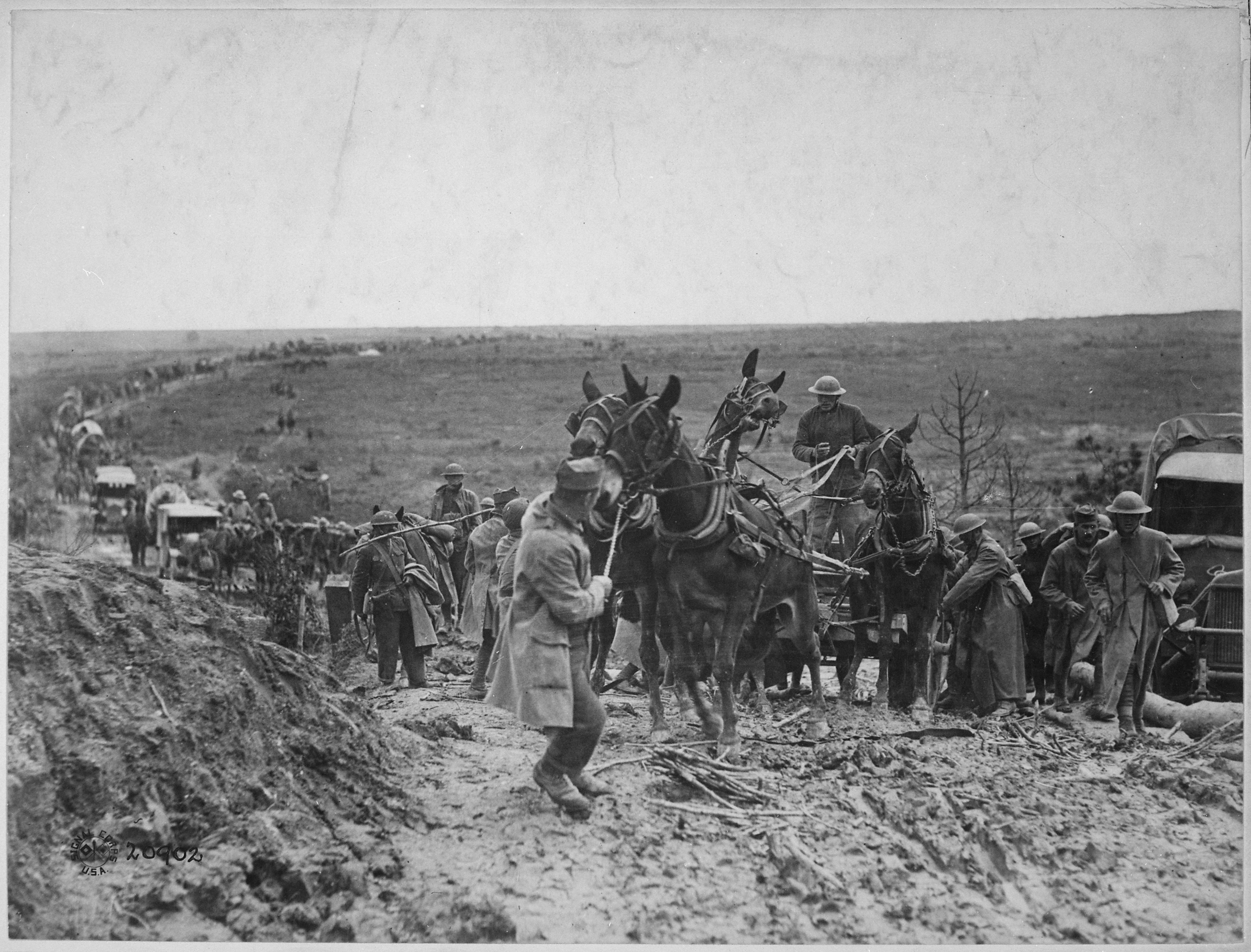
Efforts to move mules hauling an American ammunition wagon stuck in the road at St Mihiel

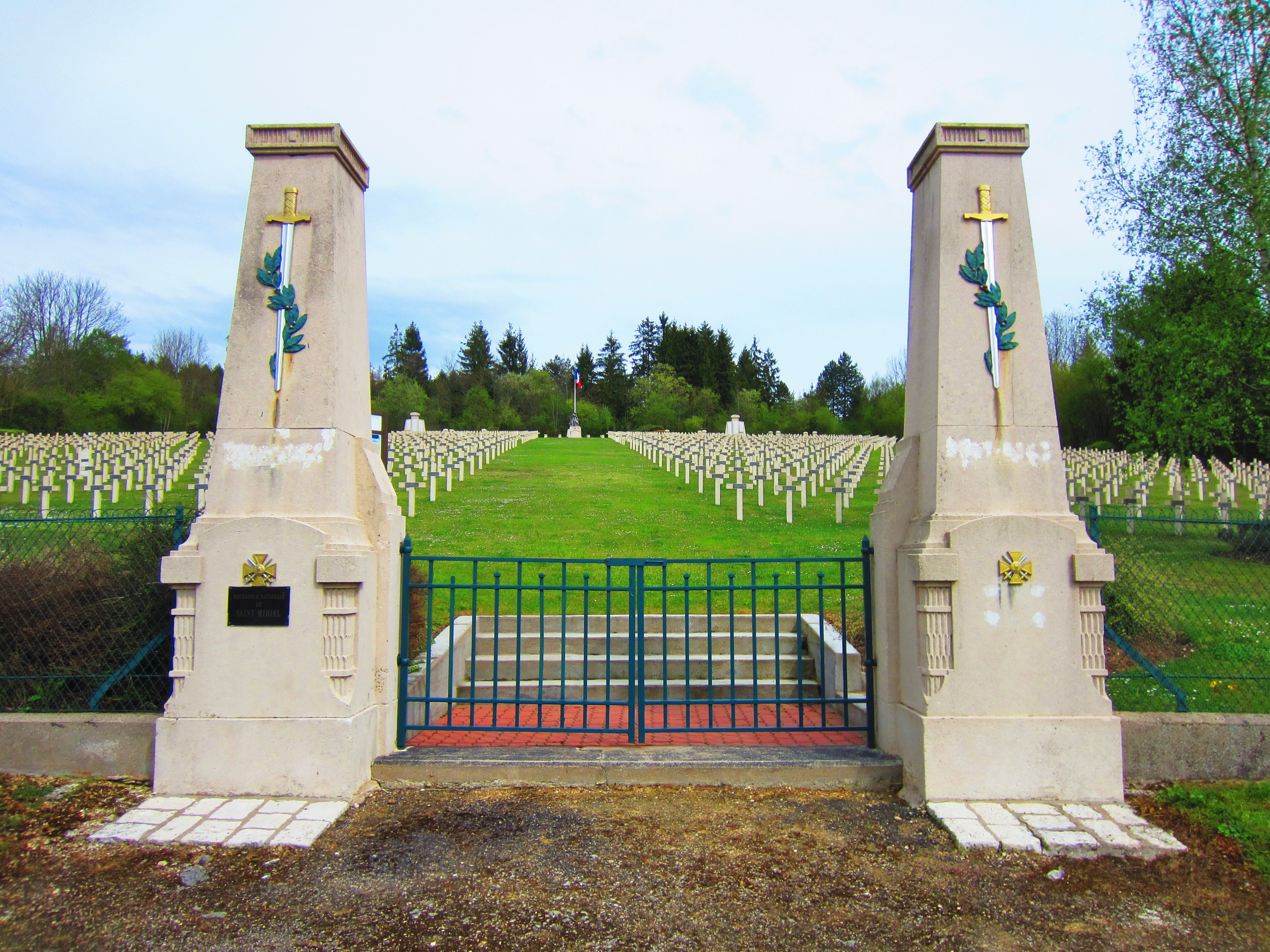
The French Cemetery at St Mihiel

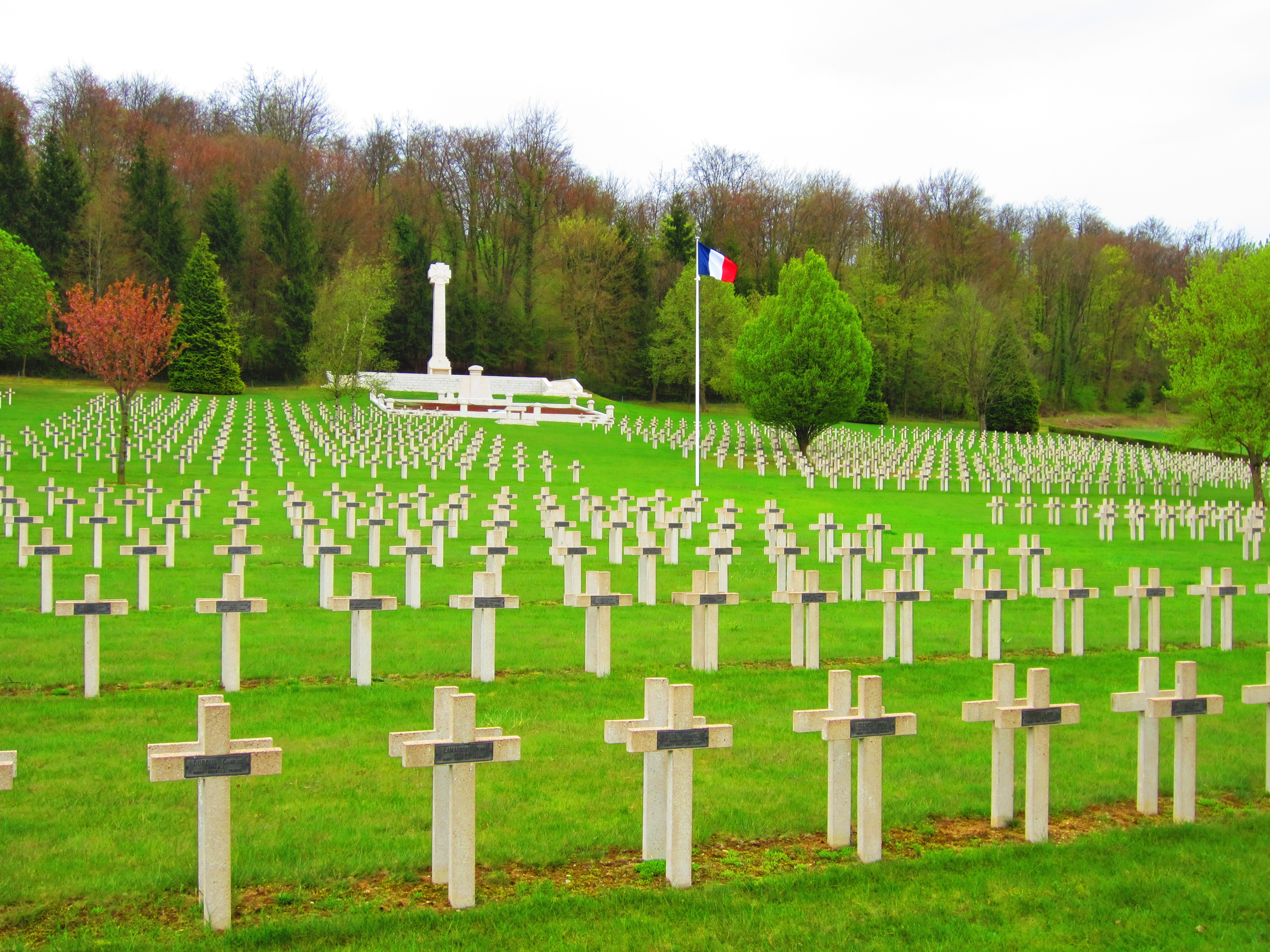
French Cemetery at Le Trottoir

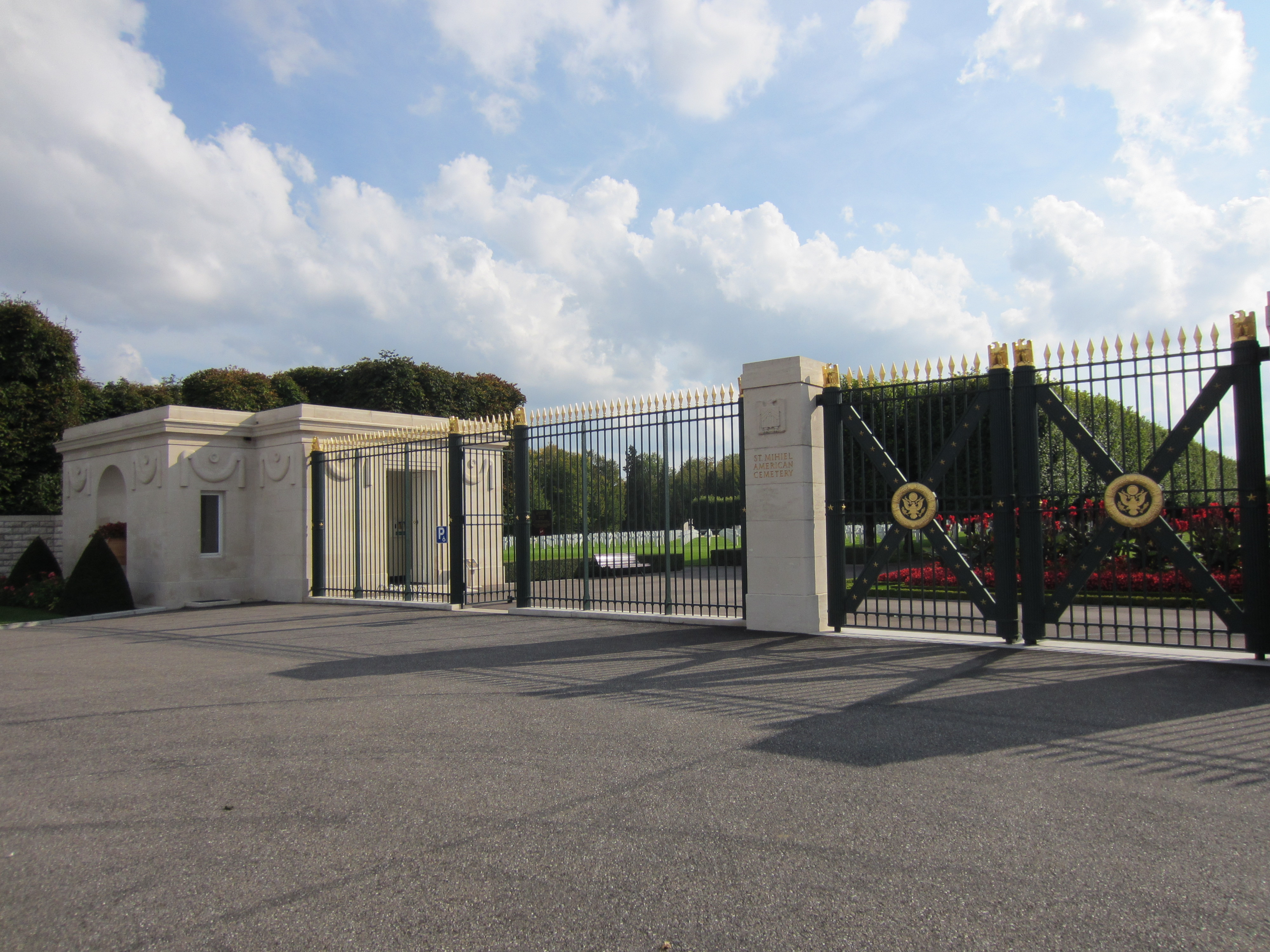
American Cemetery at Thiaucourt

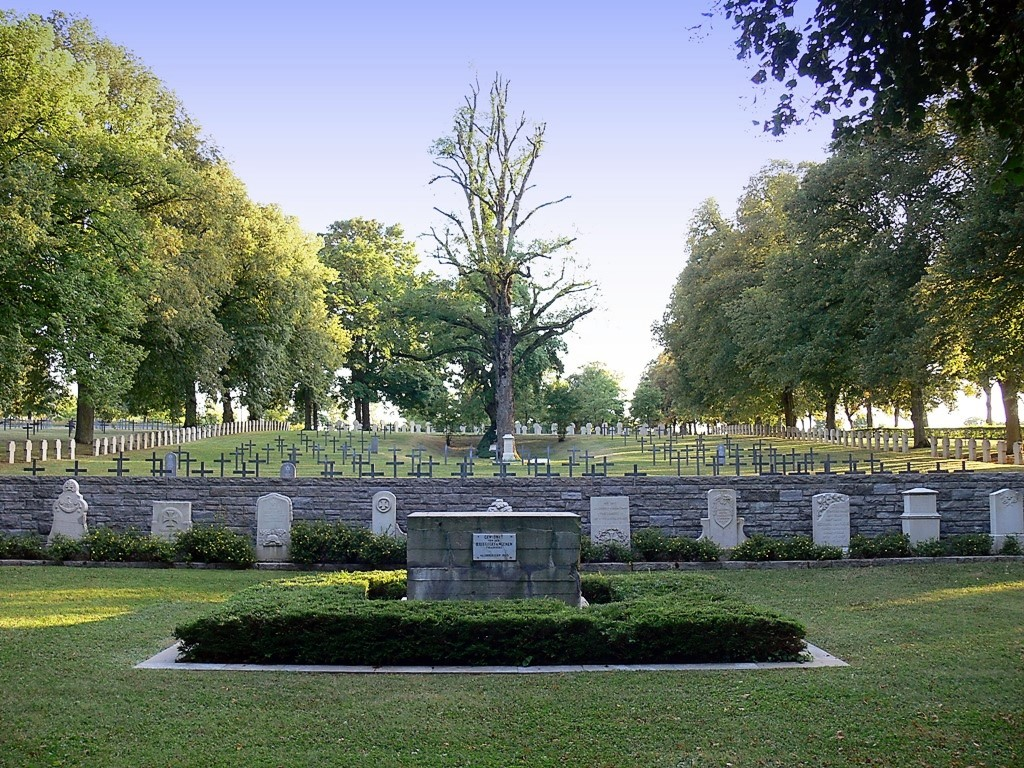
German Cemetery at Thiaucourt

== See also ==
- List of World War I Memorials and Cemeteries in Lorraine
- List of World War I Memorials and Cemeteries in Alsace
- List of World War I memorials and cemeteries in the Argonne
- List of World War I memorials and cemeteries in Artois
- List of World War I memorials and cemeteries in Champagne-Ardennes
- List of World War I memorials and cemeteries in Flanders
- List of World War I memorials and cemeteries in the Somme
- List of World War I memorials and cemeteries in Verdun
