= Saint-Thomas-en-Argonne =

- Commune
- Location of Saint-Thomas-en-Argonne
- Location within France Location within Grand Est
- Coordinates: 49°11′11″N 4°51′57″E
- Country: France
- Region: Grand Est
- Department: Marne
- Arrondissement: Châlons-en-Champagne
- Canton: Argonne Suippe et Vesle

Government
  - Mayor (2020–2026): Daniel Gouelle
- Area^{1}: 4.43 km^{2} (1.71 sq mi)
- Elevation: 177 m (581 ft)
- Population (2023): 37
  - Density: 8.4/km^{2} (22/sq mi)
- Time zone: UTC+01:00 (CET)
  - Summer (DST): UTC+02:00 (CEST)
- INSEE/Postal code: 51519 /51800
- ^{1} French Land Register data, which excludes lakes, ponds, glaciers > 1 km^{2} (0.386 sq mi or 247 acres) and river estuaries.

Saint-Thomas-en-Argonne (French pronunciation: [sɛ̃ tɔmɑ ɑ̃n‿aʁɡɔn]; literally "Saint-Thomas in Argonne") is a commune in the Marne department in north-eastern France.

== See also ==
- Communes of the Marne department
