= Flémalle =

Municipality in Liège Province, Wallonia, Belgium

Flémalle: Flémåle (Walloon)
- Municipality
- Flag Coat of arms

- Location of Flémalle in Liège province
- Interactive map of Flémalle
- Location in Belgium
- Coordinates: 50°36′N 05°28′E
- Country: Belgium
- Community: French Community
- Region: Wallonia
- Province: Liège
- Arrondissement: Liège

Government
  - Mayor: Sophie Thémont (PS)
  - Governing party: PS

Area
  - Total: 36.57 km^{2} (14.12 sq mi)

Population (2018-01-01)
  - Total: 26,174
  - Density: 715.7/km^{2} (1,854/sq mi)
- Postal codes: 4400
- NIS code: 62120
- Area codes: 04
- Website: www.flemalle.be

Flémalle (French: [flemal]; Walloon: Flémåle) is a municipality of Wallonia within the Liège Province in Belgium.

As of 2024, it has a population of 27,002, and together with the municipalities of Liège, Seraing, Herstal, Saint-Nicolas, and Ans, forms the Liège metropolitan area, with a total population of 381,340. Flémalle's geographical location, between valleys, Hesbaye, and Condroz, as well as between countryside and urban areas, offers a mix of nature, as seen in the locality of Gleixhe, and urban environments like its center or the suburb of Les Trixhes.

Despite its steep terrain, the municipality must address the increasing population in the metropolitan area; it is located near Seraing, highways, the Meuse, and the Liège Airport. To address this, the municipality has launched several large-scale projects, such as the construction of a brand-new neighborhood, Flémalle-Neuve, which is expected to be completed in a few years.

Historically, the municipality has witnessed the birth and advancement of paleontology and prehistoric studies thanks to Dr. Philippe-Charles Schmerling. A Roman diploma was also discovered in the area. During the Middle Ages, the municipality experienced economic prosperity due to the Prince-Bishopric of Liège, particularly in the village of Chokier, where a tsar, Peter the Great, and several generals from various empires stayed. During both World Wars, it played a crucial role in the defense of Liège with its fort.

André Cools is a historical figure in Flémalle's politics, but his influence extended beyond the municipality. He served as Minister of the Budget, Vice Prime Minister, President of the PSB, the PS, and the Walloon Parliament, before being assassinated in 1991.

Sports are also a significant source of recognition for the municipality, with several prominent athletes from the region and the country having connections to Flémalle. Notably, two kickboxing world championships have been held in the municipality. In team sports, ROC Flémalle is one of the top handball clubs in the country, with three Belgian Cups and eleven national titles.

== Toponymy ==
Like Bomal, Emael, Fumal, Hermalle-sous-Argenteau, Hermalle-sous-Huy, Lamalle, Momalle, Omal, and Xhendremael, Flémalle bears the suffix "-malle" (mal, mael), which is the Walloon version of the Dutch suffix "-maal," commonly found in Hesbaye.

The name of the municipality was first mentioned in 1086 in a charter as Fleimala. In 634, the locality was called Flédismamalacha. (Note: The name of Flémalle, where does it come from?, through the centuries, Historical Commission, August 2009, p. 2.)

== History ==
=== Prehistory ===
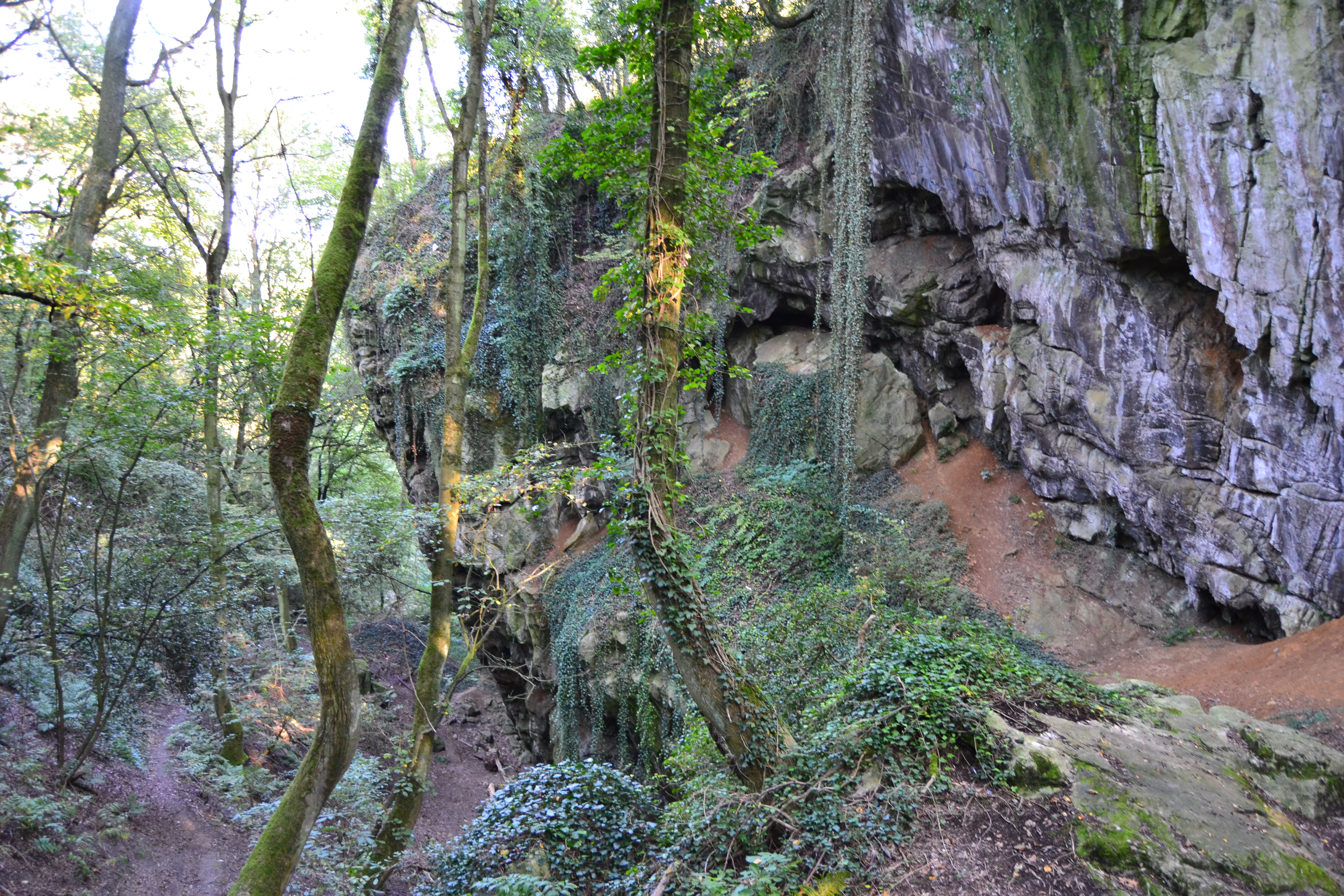
The Schmerling Caves, near Engis, in Awirs.

The prehistoric and paleontological advancements we know today about the Flémalle region as well as the world, are due to Dr. Philippe-Charles Schmerling, a professor from University of Liège, who explored several caves in the Liège region including those at Chokier and Schmerling Caves.

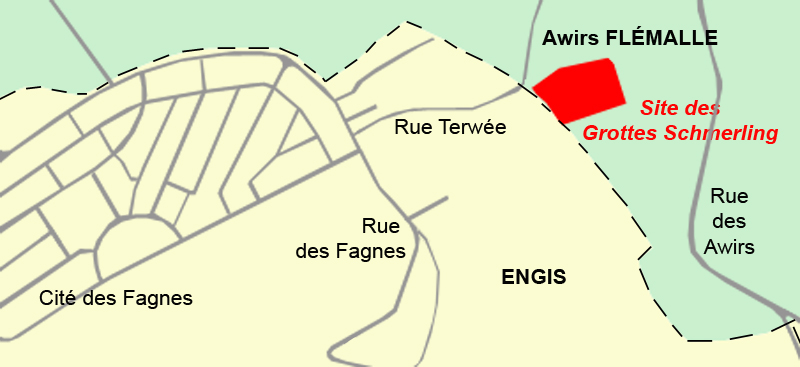
Location of the Schmerling Caves.

They were named "Engis Caves" by Schmerling before being named in his honor. Schmerling believed the caves were located within the territory of the commune of Engis. They are known worldwide for being the site where the first Neanderthal-type fossil bone, Engis 2, was discovered. He also discovered the second fossil deposit of Homo sapiens in these caves. Other bones of this type were only found in Wales at that time.

There was a second cave, but it has collapsed. The site is listed on the Exceptional Heritage List of the Walloon Region. The discovery of the Schmerling Caves dates back to 1929.

The other cave in the commune, located in the entity of Ivoz-Ramet, is the Ramioul Cave. It was discovered in 1911 by Les Chercheurs de la Wallonie. Various excavations have uncovered several layers corresponding to successive occupations between 70,000 BC (Neanderthals) and 2300 BC with Aurignacian and Mousterian remains. The cave belongs to the Préhistomuseum, one of the largest European museums on Prehistory.

=== Antiquity ===
When, between 57 and 50 BCE, Julius Caesar conquered Gaul, the population of Flémalle and its surroundings became Roman. This conquest of Gaul allowed Belgium to adopt the knowledge, customs, and traditions of the Romans.

A document, a pagan altar stone, informs us about the worship of the deity Mosea.

==== Roman Diploma ====
The Flémalle Roman diploma is an archaeological document of great importance. It dates from the reign of Trajan, from the year 98. It was recovered from the Meuse River in 1880. This diploma, belonging to a soldier from Tongeren (though this is disputed), tells us that the holder of such a document, a Roman soldier, could obtain leave to return to his village. However, this document poses a problem because many soldiers had a villa built where they conducted their military campaign.

=== Middle Ages ===
When the Western Roman Empire came to an end, the Franks took advantage to invade the former Roman territories. The historical period we are interested in here is that of the Principality of Liège, which emerged through misunderstandings and succession wars after the death of Charlemagne.

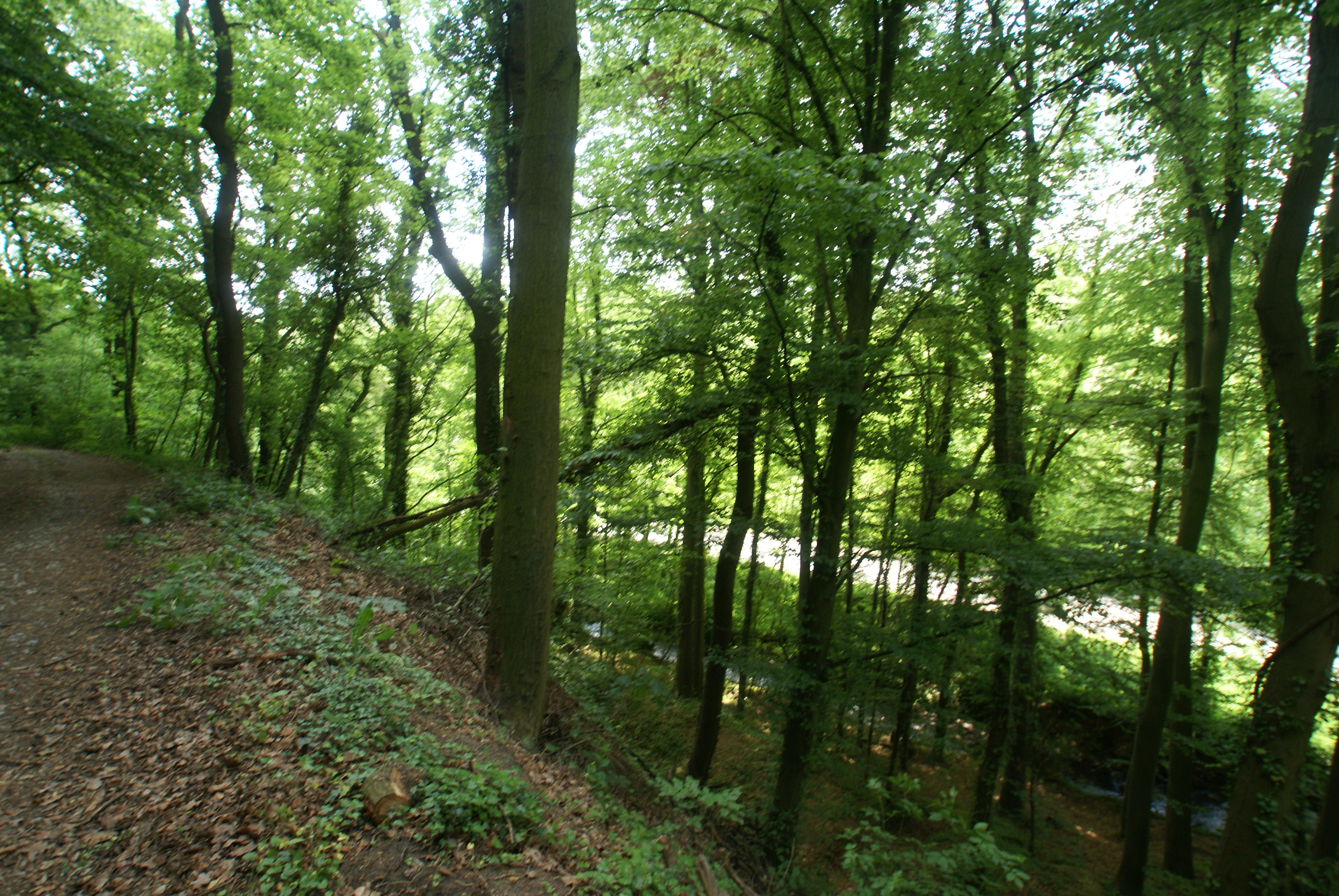
The Awirs stream and its surroundings. It is a tributary of the Meuse. It is at its mouth and in the village of Awirs that the alum industry was most important.

The Awirs stream brought prosperity to the locality with mills, (Note: C. Martin, Why a mill square in Chokier?, Historical Commission, Flémalle Chronicles, May 2012.) zinc and lead mines that were exploited until the 15th century. Also in Awirs, the presence of a Cistercian monastery can be noted.

In the village of Chokier, it is believed that lime kilns were present due to a 1086 charter that specifies a land exchange between the village and the Saint-Jacques Abbey. This parcel was located under "Calchariae," meaning lime kiln. (Note: Luc Malchair, Commune of Flémalle – Aigremont – Chokier – The Hermitage, Memoir, Center for Continuing Education for Nature Protection, 1993–1994.)

Industry was already very present as, besides the lime kilns of Chokier, there was also coal and quarry exploitation dating back to the 14th and 15th century. This exploitation lasted over time as the last Flémalle coal mine closed in 1955. (Note: A PDF document from the Flémalle center MasterPlan mentions this last Flémalle coal mine)

==== Seigneuries ====
The Principality is divided into several districts, including La Hesbaye, where the current territory was located. This district was composed of counties, including Hozémont, to which the Awirs, Gleixhe, Chokier, and the two Flémalle (the Grand and the Small) were attached. (Note: Joseph Daris, Histoire du diocèse et de la principauté de Liège pendant le XIIIe et le XIVe siècle, Liège, Louis Demarteau, 1891, 710 p.) The Council of Hozémont played an important role in the region.

Flémalle, within its current territory, was divided into several seigneuries:

- Seigneurie de Flémalle-Haute

By the end of the 12th century, Flémalle and its seigneury belonged to the Chapter of Saint Peter. In 1173, according to the knowledge of canon Van den Berghe, it is learned that the seigneury was given to the Templars. Another lord owned lands in Flémalle, which were confirmed by pope Honorius III. (Note: Bormans Stanislas, II. Notice des Cartulaires de la collégiale de Saint-Denis, à Liège. In: Compte-rendu des séances de la commission royale d'histoire. Deuxième Série, Tome 14, 1872. pp. 23–190)

In the 13th century, Flémalle was shared between four seigneuries: the Chapter of Saint Peter, the Brethren of Saint John, the Abbey of Saint-Laurent, and the Regular Brethren of Saint Augustine of Val-Benoît.

- Seigneurie des Awirs

In the 12th century, the seigneuries of Awirs and Aigremont were united and belonged to a vassal of the Bishop of Liège. In the 13th century, the seigneuries were held by the Limbourg family, and in the 14th century, by the La Marck family. (Note: The inventory of the archives of the Hemricourt family, preserved at the Archives of the State in Belgium, informs us about the families owning the seigneury) The seigneury had its own court of justice and the village of Chokier.

- Seigneurie de Gleixhe

Gleixhe, formerly Awirs-Notre-Dame, named after the church of the seigneury which venerated the Virgin, was located near the seigneury of Haute-penne, whose castle still exists. It also had its own court of justice.

- Seigneurie de Chokier

The seigneury was held by the family of Hozémont before passing to the Surlet and then to the Berio. Like the other two seigneuries mentioned above, it also had a court of justice.

- Seigneurie d'Ivoz

It is part of the municipality of Ivoz-Ramet, which includes two other seigneuries. It belonged to the chapter of Saint-Lambert Cathedral and was transferred to the Abbey of Val-Saint-Lambert in 1261. It had a court of justice.

- Seigneurie de Ramet

Like Ivoz, it is part of the municipality of Ivoz-Ramet. It is known to have been a seigneury because several people between the 12th and 13th centuries bore the name Ramet. It had its court of justice.

- Seigneurie de Ramioul

Ramioul, along with Sart-Diable, belonged to the Duke of Lower Lorraine. The seigneury was transferred to the collegiate church of Saint-Servais in Maastricht, donated by Godfrey of Bouillon. It was then transferred to the Abbey of Val-Saint-Lambert in 1236, and later to André de Bincken and finally to the Hemricourt.

- Seigneurie de Mons

Mons, like Souxhon, Ruy, and the two Crotteux (Saint-Martin and Saint-Pierre), belonged to the municipality of Mons-lez-Liège. The seigneury had its court of justice.

==== War of the Awans and the Waroux ====
This war began in 1297 and lasted 38 years. It profoundly marked the history of La Hesbaye, which never recovered from this war. This conflict between seigneuries gained significant magnitude because the Prince-Bishop of Liège was unable to end it.

The war pitted the seigneuries of Awans, Bovenistier, Diepenbeck, Fermes, Fontin, Haneffe, and Hozémont against the seigneuries of Waroux, Berloz, Hermalle, Horion, Jemeppe, and Oborne. This war was fratricidal, meaning that the Awans and the Waroux descended from the same lineage and fought each other. The war began when Adoule, a young maid who was to marry a cousin of the Awans, was abducted by a squire of the Waroux. The war devastated the region completely and led to the rise of the bourgeoisie, the decline of the power of the Prince-Bishop of Liège, and the destruction of several castles, including those of Awans and Waroux. It is Jacques de Hemricourt, through his chronicle, who informs us about this war.

During the period of municipal management, the Chapter of Saint Peter exercised legislative and regulatory power, judicial power (the municipality had its own court of justice), and fiscal power.

=== Modern times ===
In the 16th century, the small chapel in the village of Chokier was dedicated to Saint Marcellin. It became a parish church in 1592. On the grounds of the Chokier Castle, a farm exploiting several hectares of vineyards appeared in the 17th century. The village also saw the exploitation of alum.

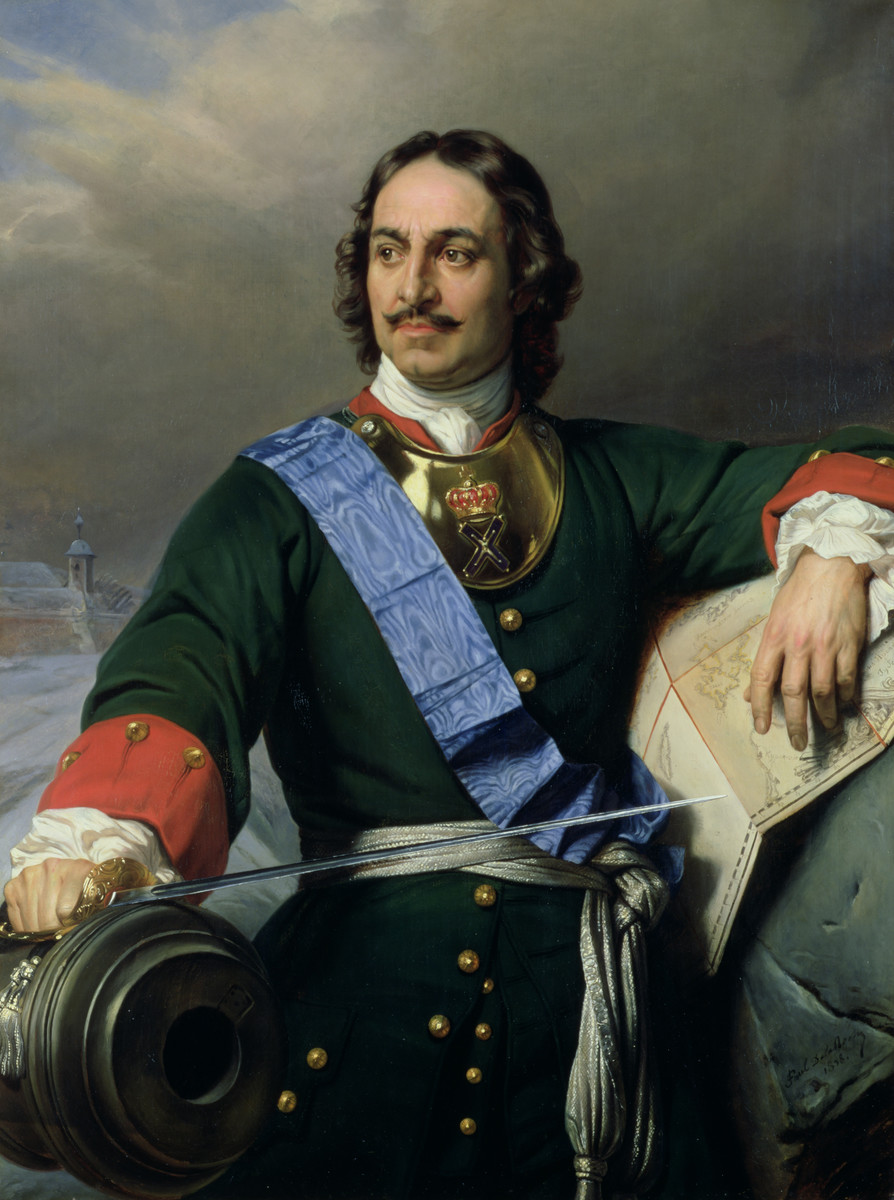
Peter the Great, Tsar of Russia, visiting Liège, Spa, and Maastricht, stopped at Chokier.

In 1717, Tsar Peter I stopped at Chokier while traveling to Liège. He was welcomed by the mayor with festivities.

In the basin of the Awirs stream, there are traces of alum workings from the 17th and 18th centuries. This alum activity is also found in Flémalle-Haute and Flémalle-Grande, with alum mines exploited from the 16th to the 18th century. This interest in the industry began in the 15th century with the Saint-Pierre chapter that operated numerous quarries. The parish of Saint-Mathias, in 1762, replaced the former.

The church located in Gleixhe, which gave the name Awirs-Notre-Dame to the locality, was destroyed during the Middle Ages. In 1779, it was reconstructed and placed under the authority of the Saint-Lambert Cathedral.

=== Contemporary Era ===
The last alum mine in Awirs, specifically that of Aigremont, closed in 1816, with the last one in the municipality also closing in the 19th century. Still in this locality, coal mining operations began, leading to a prosperous industrial period. The last coal mine in Awirs closed in 1928. This coal industry covered almost the entire territory. The last coal mine in Flémalle closed in 1955.

In 1938, the Ivoz-Ramet barrage bridge was inaugurated. It was dynamited two years later in 1940 to slow the advance of the Wehrmacht. It was rebuilt during World War II.

During World War II, like Liège, Flémalle was bombed. A tunnel in Flémalle is reported to have served as a refuge for the population.

==== World War I ====
In August 1914, Belgium was invaded by the German Army; the first city affected was Liège and its region. Despite the numerous fortifications surrounding the city, including Fort of Flémalle, the fortified belt was put out of service. The Netherlands, barely ten kilometers from Liège, became a destination for the region's inhabitants to flee the war, as the Dutch were not involved in the conflict.

It was due to this proximity to the Dutch border and specifically the city of Maastricht that the Atlas V, an armored tugboat, left the city on the night of 3 to 4 January 1917 with 107 people on board. The expedition to the Netherlands was tumultuous as the Germans began to chase the boat near Argenteau. Among the four crew members, two were from Flémalle, named Jean Job and Raoul Longueville, and another Flémalle resident among the passengers, Joseph Fagard. The captain was Jules Hentjens.

==== The water crossing accident ====
On 23 January 1918, around 5:30 pm, workers from the Cedauville factory, located on the right bank of the Meuse, residing on the left bank, in Jemeppe and Flémalle-Haute, used a ferry that could hold a maximum of 60 people. There were 80 people rushing onto the ferry. The ferry operator had to make two trips, and it was during this second crossing that the accident occurred. (Note: Historical Commission of Flémalle, La Meuse, les passages d'eau. – La catastrophe de 1918 -, Les Chroniques, January 2010.)

The hook guiding the ferryboat on the cable broke. Panicked, the workers moved to the front of the boat, causing it to capsize and overturn. Of the 37 passengers, only 4 survived.

==== December 1930 atmospheric accident ====
This atmospheric accident is one of the most severe of the time in Europe and still serves as an example of the need for pollution protection. This disaster caused the death of more than 60 people, while around 300 others were injured or fell ill in the following days. The accident occurred in Engis, a neighboring municipality to Flémalle, to the west. It is now considered the most polluted municipality in Belgium, but since 1930, measures have been taken to prevent another such accident.

It was only in 1968 that these measures were implemented with the installation of over 200 atmospheric monitoring stations, controlling levels of sulfur dioxide and black particles.

From 1 to 5 December 1930, a fog stagnated over the Meuse valley, stretching from Jemeppe to Huy. This accident partly occurred due to the morphology of the valley. Indeed, over one to two kilometers wide, the valley's height is 60 to 80 meters, while the top of the valley, that is, the plateaus on the right and left banks, reaches more than 200 meters in some places. During this first week of December, atmospheric pressure was extremely high, around 1030 mbar, and it was cold (0 °C during the day and as low as −10 °C at night) with a weak east wind, ranging from one to three km/h. This is referred to as a Temperature inversion.

The inversion caused the coldest air mass to be unable to pass above the warmer one, trapping the fog in the valley and preventing the cold air mass from escaping. The chimneys of the 27 large factories in the valley, not exceeding 70 meters, meant that the pollution could not escape the valley, creating a vicious cycle. This event is comparable to the Great Smog of London in 1952.

The fog dissipated on 5 and 6 December, lasting less than a week, but the damage was done. The sick were affected by severe respiratory failure, as well as cough, heart failure, nausea, vomiting, and tearing. In addition to the human toll, there was an even heavier impact on livestock, with a pig farmer slaughtering his pigs one by one.

The human losses were distributed across the municipalities of Hermalle-sous-Huy, Engis, La Maillieu, Flémalle-Grande, Flémalle-Haute, Vierset, Ivoz-Ramet, Seraing, Jemeppe, and Ougrée. Of the 60 deaths, 20 were in the former municipalities of Flémalle. (Note: See the IHOES analysis No. 125 of 13 May 2014, by Alexis Zimmer, providing a table of deaths by pre-merger municipalities)

==== Railway accident of 1 December 1946 ====
The railway line from Liège to Namur runs along the back of the village of Chokier, below the promontory where the castle is located. At the time, the castle had a terrace overlooking the Meuse Valley. On 1 December 1946, a rock face collapsed, taking with it the western part of the castle terrace, which fell 80 meters onto the railway tracks below. Fortunately, this accident did not result in any casualties. Just two minutes earlier, a train carrying 400 workers had passed by, while another train was delayed. The accident primarily caused economic damage as the rocks blocked the railway from 1 December 1946, to 15 January 1947. To accommodate travelers, buses were continuously stationed at the Flémalle-Haute station to provide connections.

==== Aviation accident of December 1989 ====
In December 1989, Pieter Demuynck, a lieutenant pilot, was on a mission aboard a Mirage. A malfunction on the aircraft forced the lieutenant to keep his Mirage in flight to avoid residential areas, and he was flying over the Awirs at the time. He ejected a few moments later but did not survive. However, he managed to avoid a major accident. The plane crashed outside the village, causing only minor damage. A commemorative plaque is located at the site where the lieutenant died.

== Geography ==
=== Sections ===
Flémalle is composed of eight sections: Awirs, Chokier, Flémalle-Grande, Flémalle-Haute, Gleixhe, Ivoz-Ramet, Les Cahottes, and Mons-lez-Liège. The most populated section is Flémalle-Haute, with 6391 inhabitants, while the least populated is Gleixhe, with 260 inhabitants.

==== Localities and hamlets ====
There are around 90 localities and hamlets of various sizes and populations.

Some localities in Flémalle

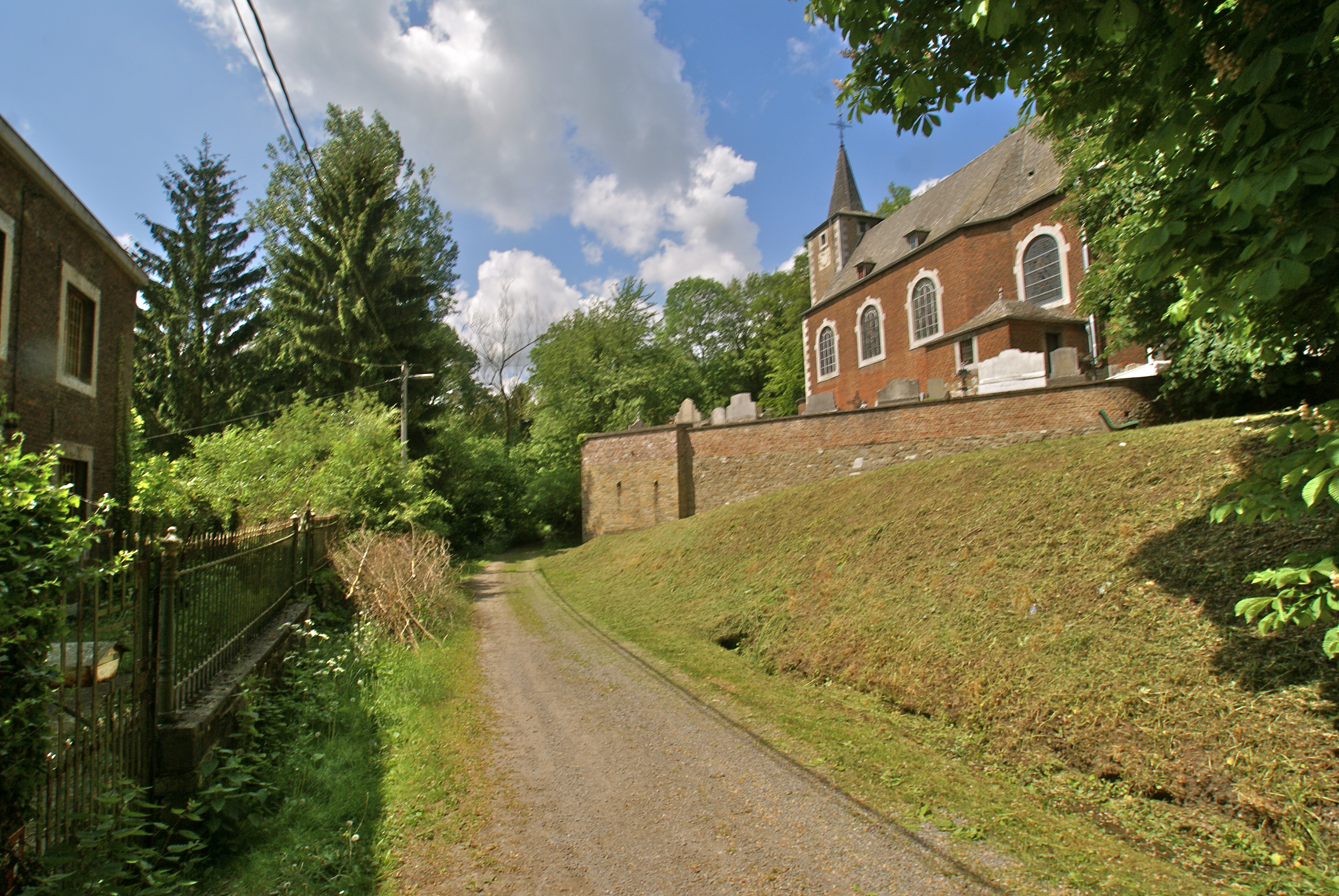
Gleixhe.

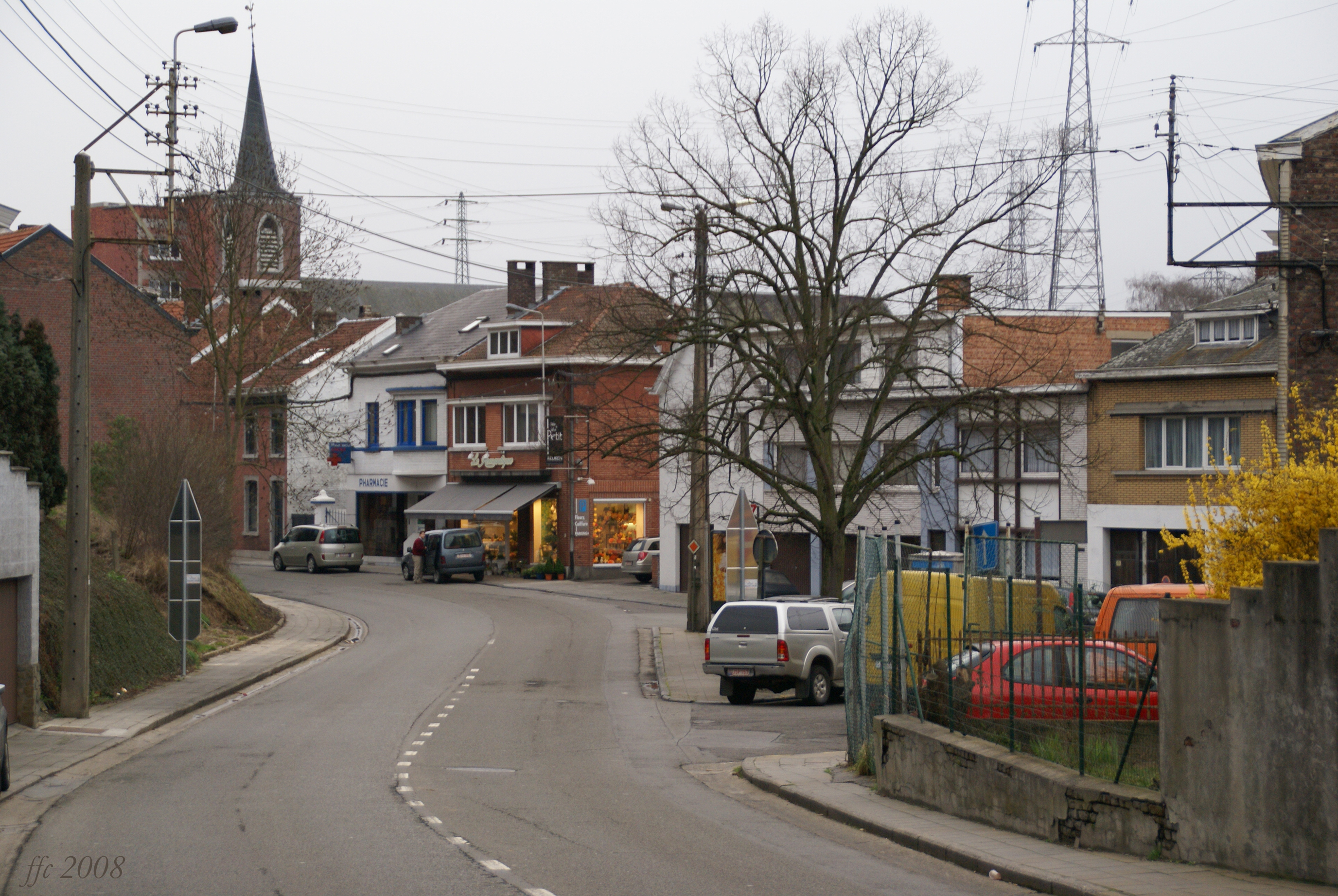
The center of Ivoz.

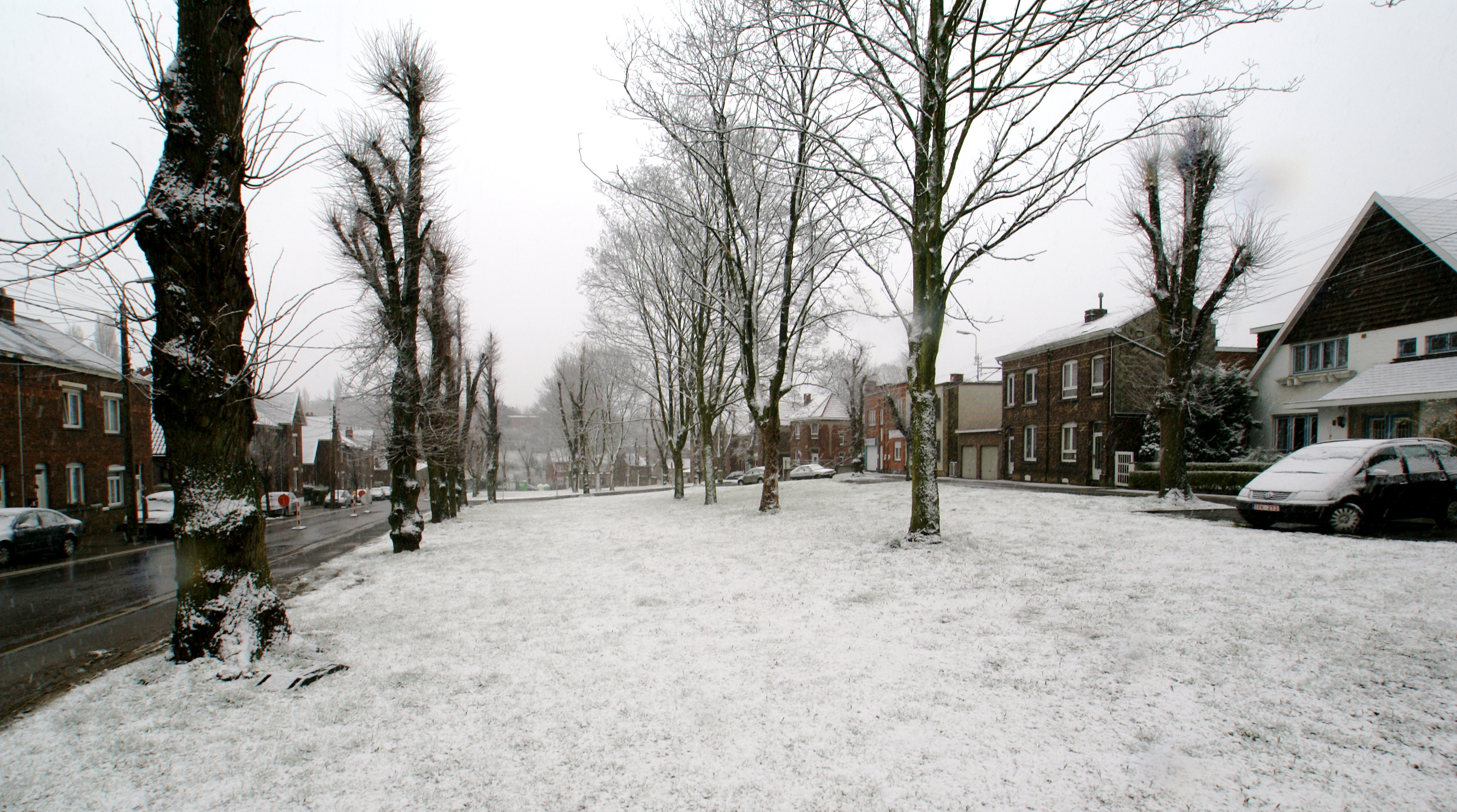
Profondval and its square in winter.

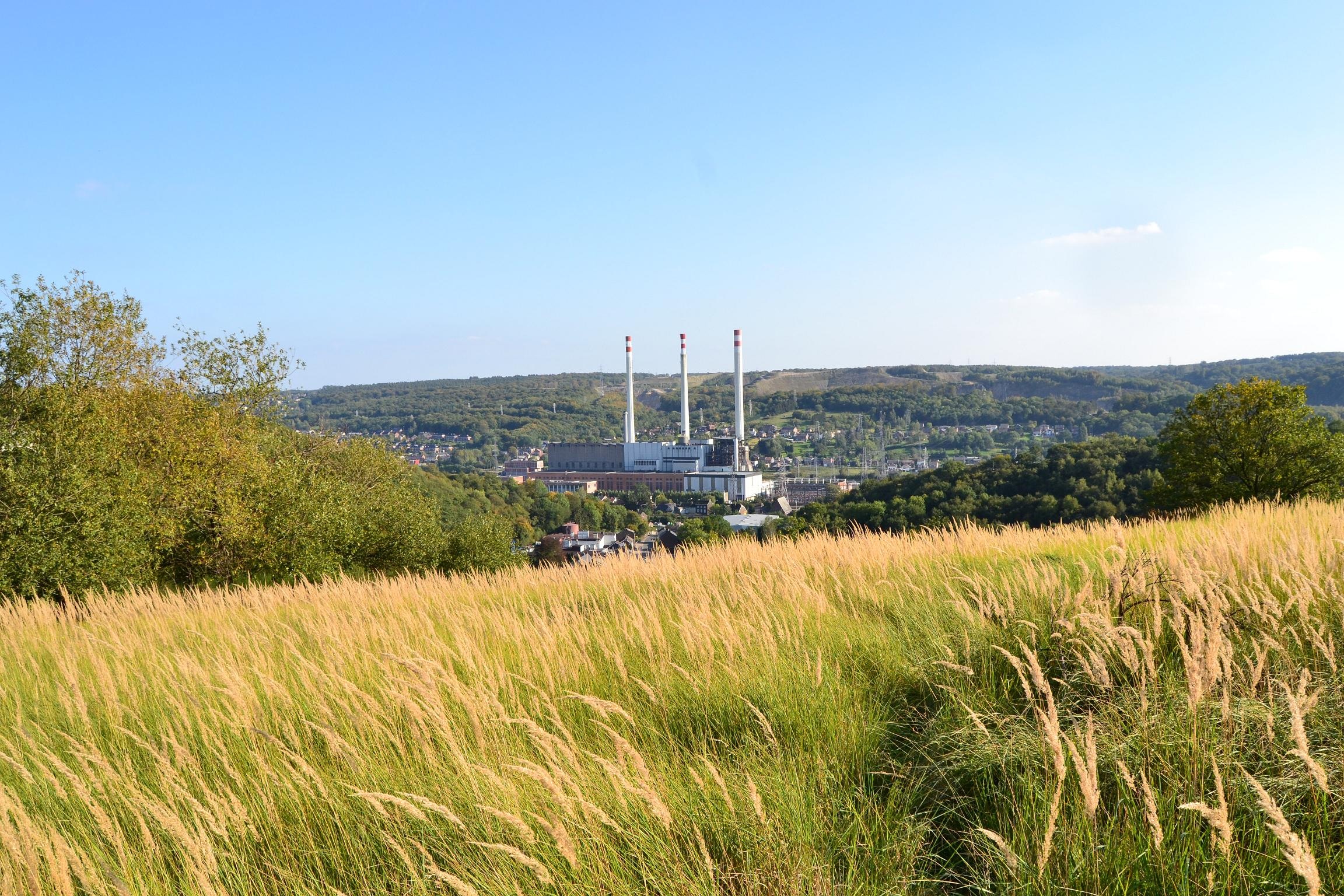
Plain of the Awirs and its power plant in the background.

==== Les Trixhes ====
The Trixhes plateau was created under the aesthetic vision of urban architects from the L'Équerre Group. The layout of this neighborhood can be described as a garden city or park city. The project was commissioned by Théodule Gonda, then themayor of Flémalle in 1937, but the first construction sites did not begin until the early 1950s.

The decision to build a neighborhood in such a location was made to open up the municipality, positioning it as a satellite community between Liège and the countryside. Four housing units were constructed, totaling 1,326 units (453 houses and 873 apartments). Two additional units were planned, but a moratorium on social housing in 1982 altered the plans for the Trixhes plateau. This neighborhood is characterized by post-war modernist architecture, with low-rise buildings, single-family homes, a spacious layout with ample greenery, and pedestrian walkways.

During 1979 and 1982, a renovation project for Unit IV was launched. The units in this section suffered from severe humidity problems. The issues were so severe that the unit was eventually demolished. Today, remnants of this unit can still be seen in the southwestern part of the neighborhood. Only the roads and pathways, sidewalks, streetlights, and an abandoned underground parking lot remain.

The units are divided into different neighborhoods to promote social interaction. The area includes sports and cultural centers, as well as squares, a modernist-style church, and an exceptional pedestrian network for the time, with pedestrian tunnels under the national road. The road was initially intended to avoid isolating the neighborhood from the town center, but in recent years, it has become the main link between the valley and the motorway, effectively cutting the neighborhood in two.

==== Chokier ====
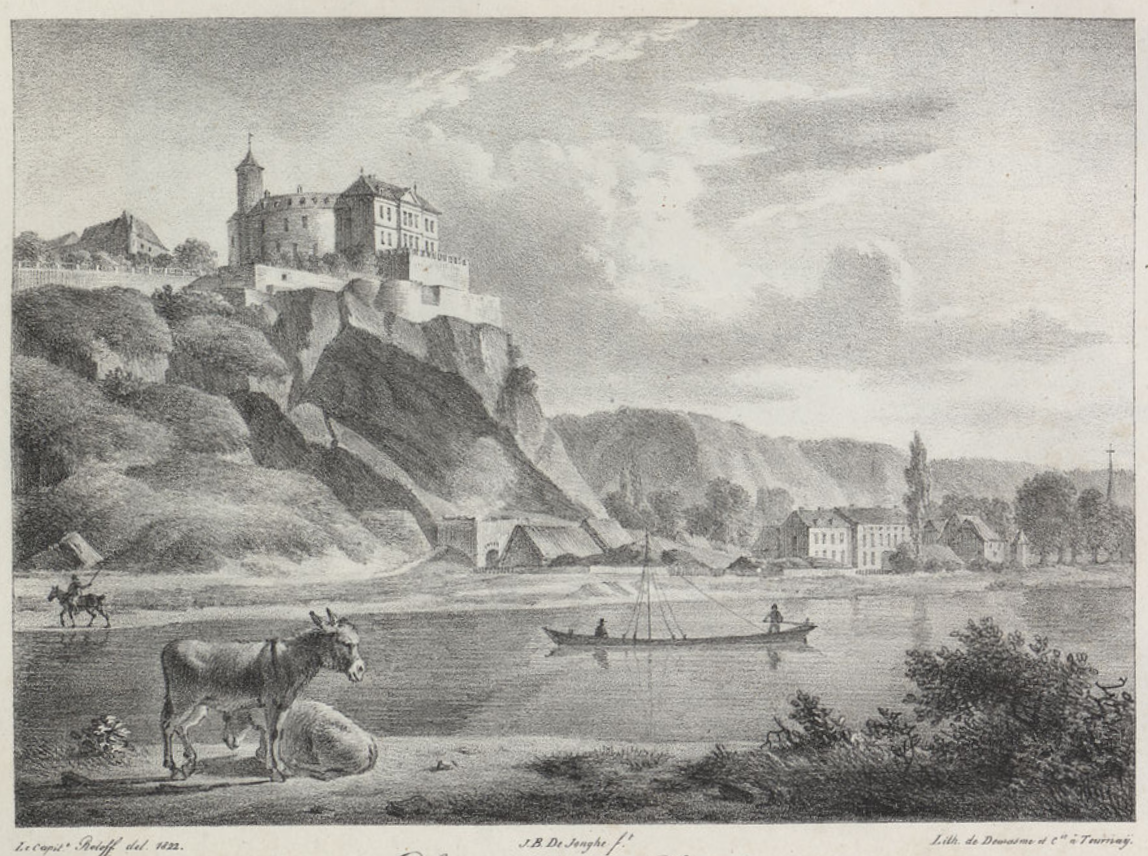
Chokier in 1822.

The Chokier district has perhaps the richest history in Flémalle. Its castle, perched on a rocky promontory, has existed since the 9th century. In the 13th century, the castle, then a fortress known as Mont Iohy, was sold by the Count of Hozémont to his nephew. In the 18th century, the fortress was transformed into the castle that is visible today.

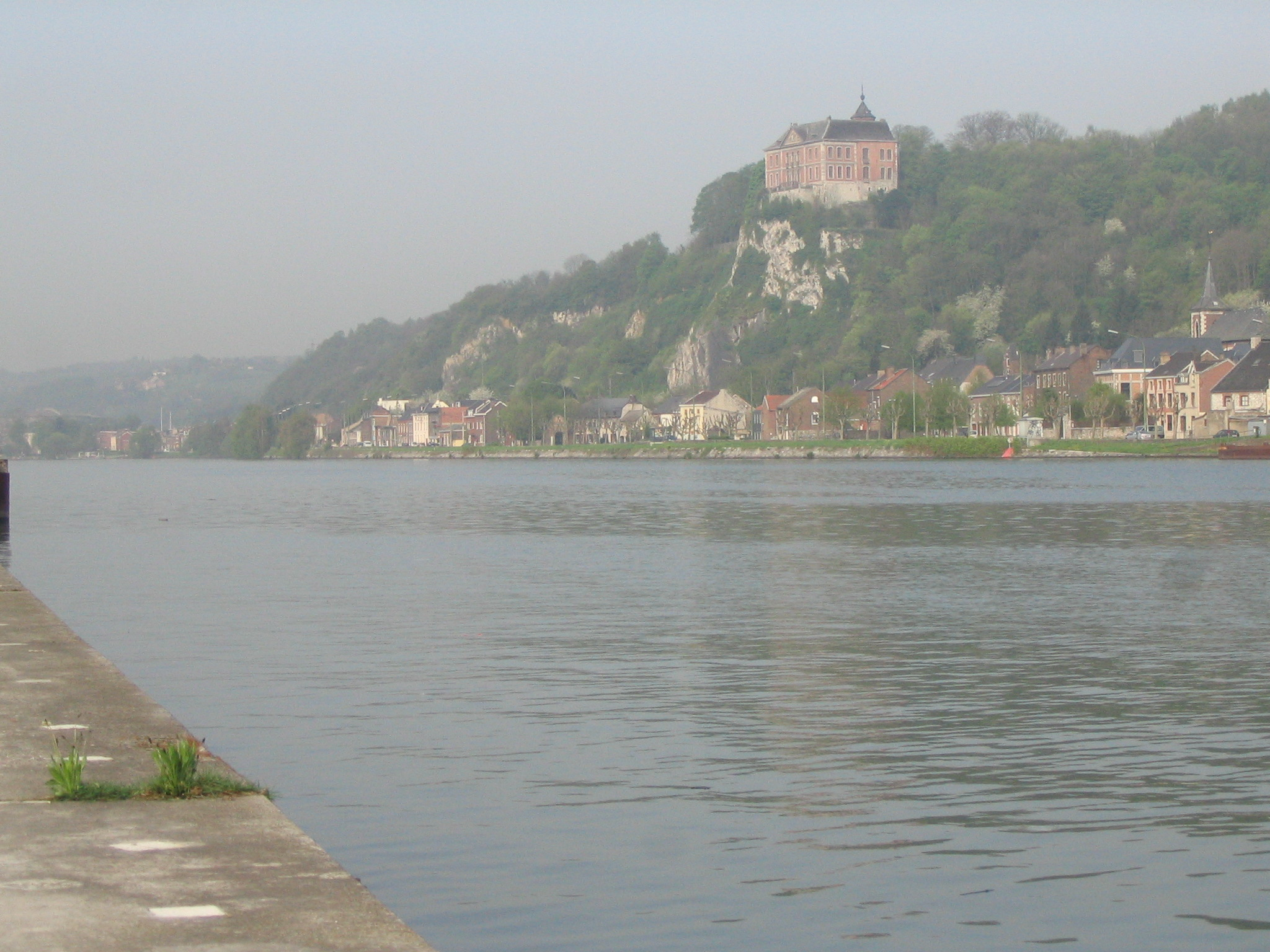
A panoramic view of Chokier and the castle from the right bank of the Meuse.

The village gained recognition in the region as early as the 11th century. It was home to viticulture, a brewery, a cooper, a blacksmith, and inns. Between the 16th and 19th centuries, the village experienced industrial growth with the establishment of an alum works, lime kilns, a pipe-making factory, a red lead factory, a starch factory, and a tannery.

==== Les Cahottes ====
In contrast to Chokier, the village of Les Cahottes faced a different fate. This less populated and more prosperous village underwent a wave of expropriation due to development. As a result, today, the village has lost nearly half of its population.

== Location ==
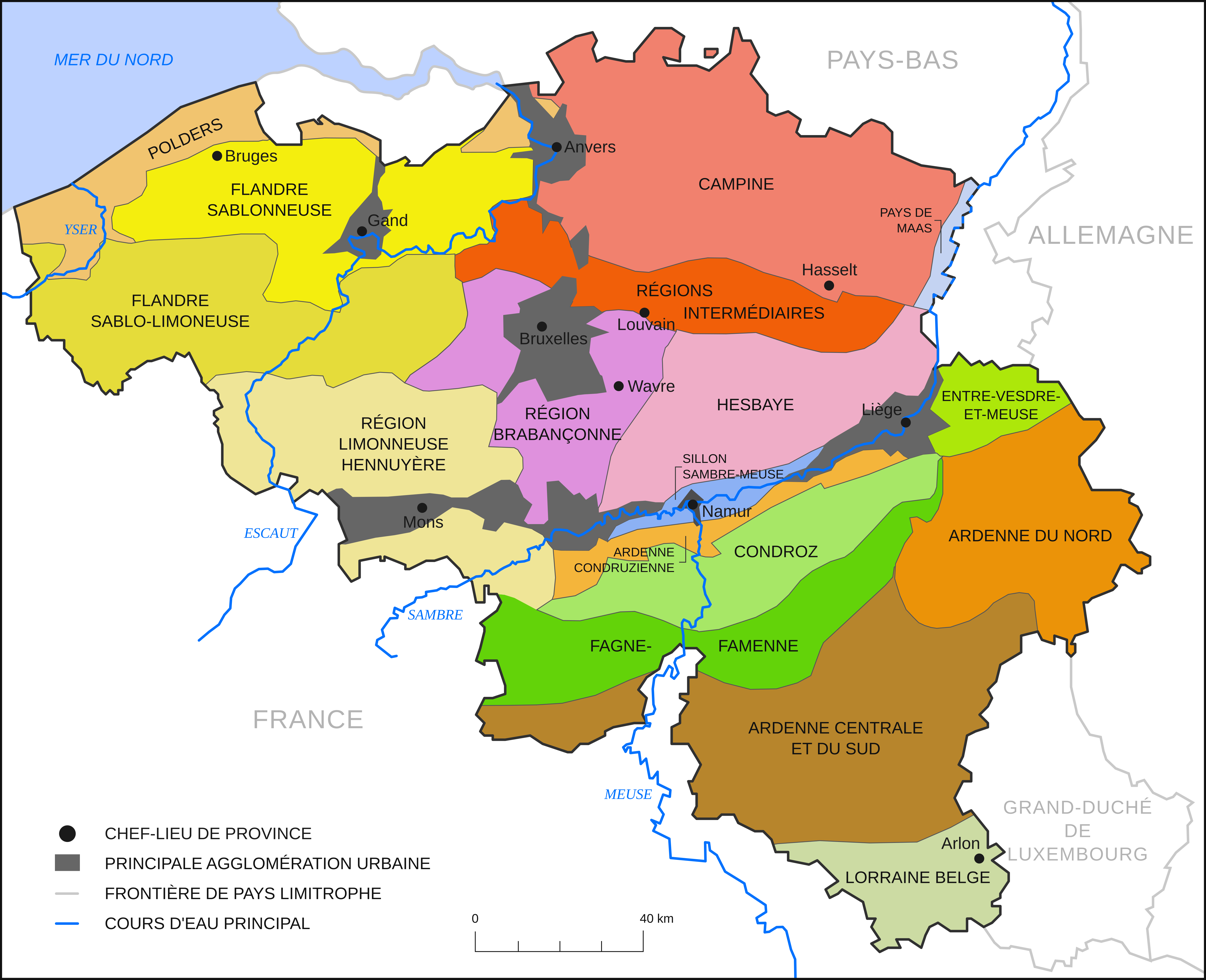
The natural regions in Belgium. In pink, the Hesbaye; in light green, the Condroz. Flémalle is located along the Meuse in the urban agglomeration of Liège. Ardenne-Condroz region is also found in Flémalle.

The municipality is located in the east of Belgium, west of Liège, along the Meuse communication axis between France and Germany and between southern and northern Europe. Indeed, at the far north is the European route E42 and the Loncin interchange, located in the municipality of Ans as well as Liège Airport, one of the most important freight airports in Western Europe. Situated along the Meuse, it acts as a buffer municipality between the Meuse valley and the Hesbaye to the north and the Condroz to the south.

In orthodromic distances, it is 10.2 km from Liège (the capital of the Province of Liège), 43 km from Namur (the capital of Wallonia), 81.5 km from Brussels (the capital of Belgium), 24.1 km from the Netherlands (Eijsden), 44.1 km from the tripoint of Germany, Belgium, and the Netherlands ("Les Trois Bornes"), 60.3 km from the Grand Duchy of Luxembourg (Troisvierges), 65.1 km from France (Givet), and 172.5 km from the Belgian coast (Knokke-Heist).

Map representations of the municipality

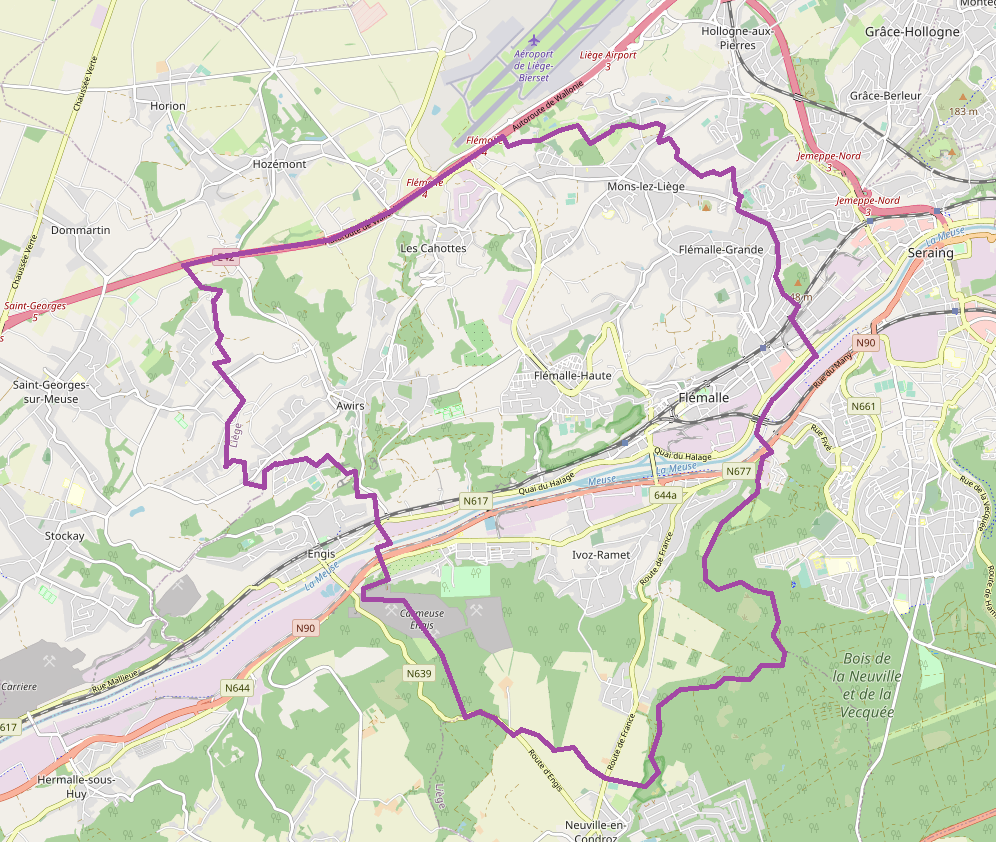
OpenStreetMap map

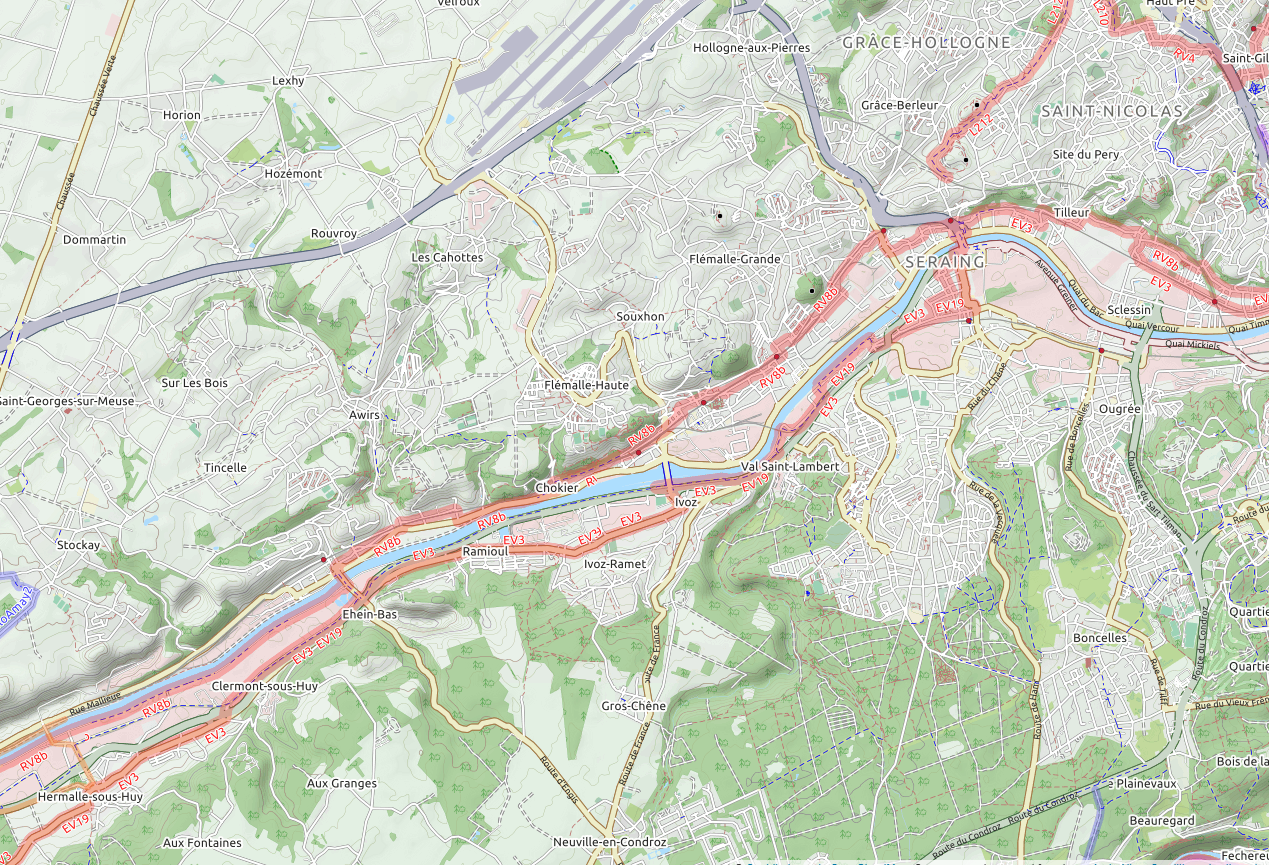
Topographic map of the Flémalle region

=== Geology and relief ===
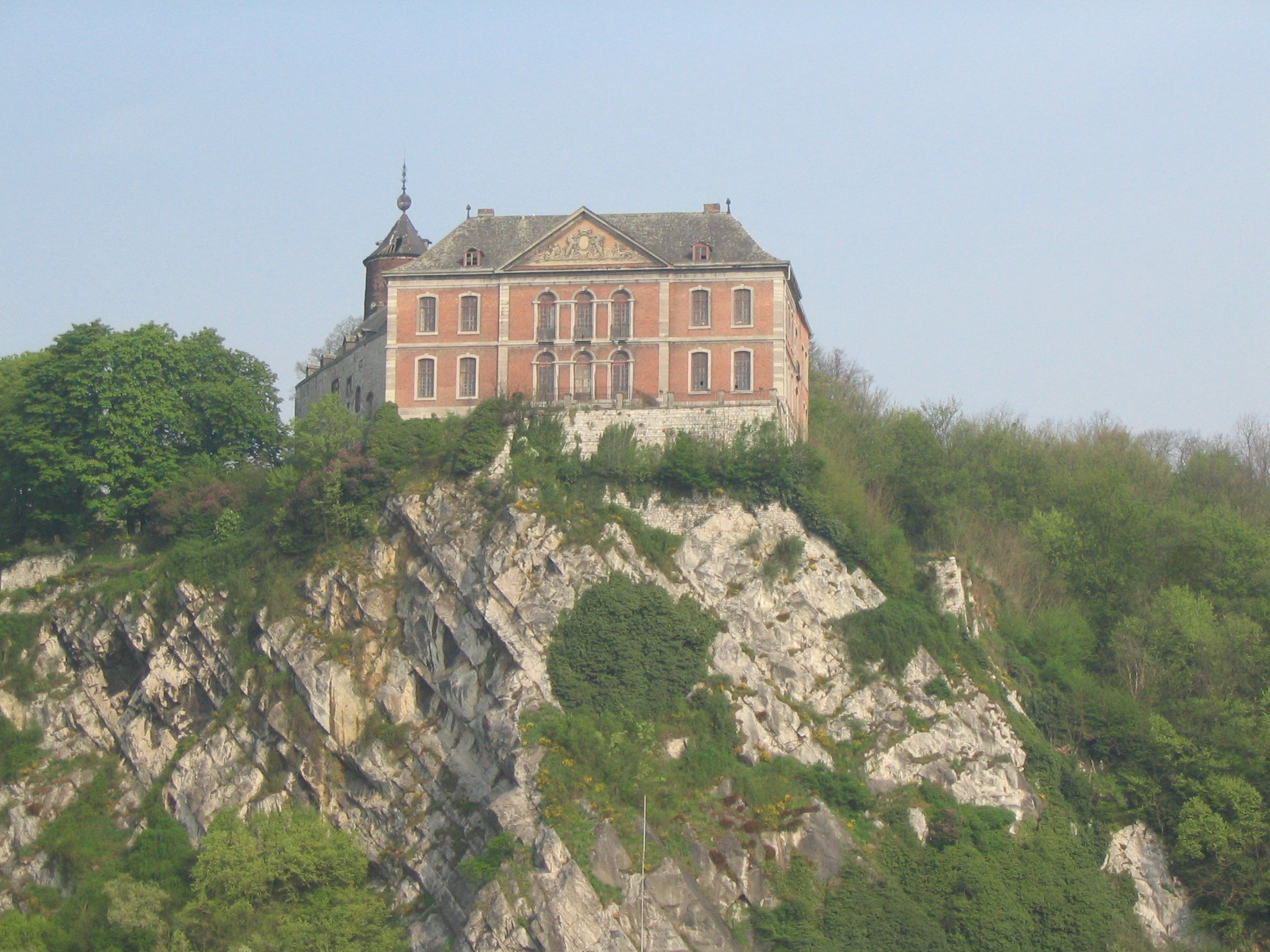
The Chokier castle on its promontory.

The municipality is marked by the Midi Fault (in Belgium, it is called the Sambre and Meuse fault), which is a geological rupture line that appeared in the Paleozoic era. The Eifelian fault, also known as the Midi fault, passes through Flémalle, as designated by Malherbe from Clermont-sous-Huy to Angleur. This fault, still active today, caused the Liège earthquake on 8 November 1983. (Note: Jongmans, Denis Campillo, Michel Revista; "Influence of the source and geological structure on the nature of the damage during the Liège earthquake of November 8, 1983"; Bulletin de la Société géologique de France, Paris, 1989, 5(4), series 8; pp. 849–857) Thus, the highway to the north of the territory, as well as most of the area and the surrounding agglomerations, such as Liège, Seraing, and Engis, are located on this fault.

The fault shapes the municipality's relief, with strong urbanized areas above the cliffs created by the fault, such as Les Trixhes, and also below, with the center of Flémalle. This fault was long exploited by various quarries. Those located behind the village of Chokier gave birth to the "Aux Roches" nature reserve. The municipality's altitude ranges from a minimum of 62 m (along the Meuse) to a maximum of 238 m (in the extreme south of the municipality). Although the south is higher than the north, it is in the north that the fault is most noticeable, notably with the Chokier Castle, which is perched on a promontory. Along the Meuse, the terrain is flat, while to the north, the terrain is hilly, particularly in Awirs with the stream; the south experiences a constant elevation rise.

=== Hydrography ===
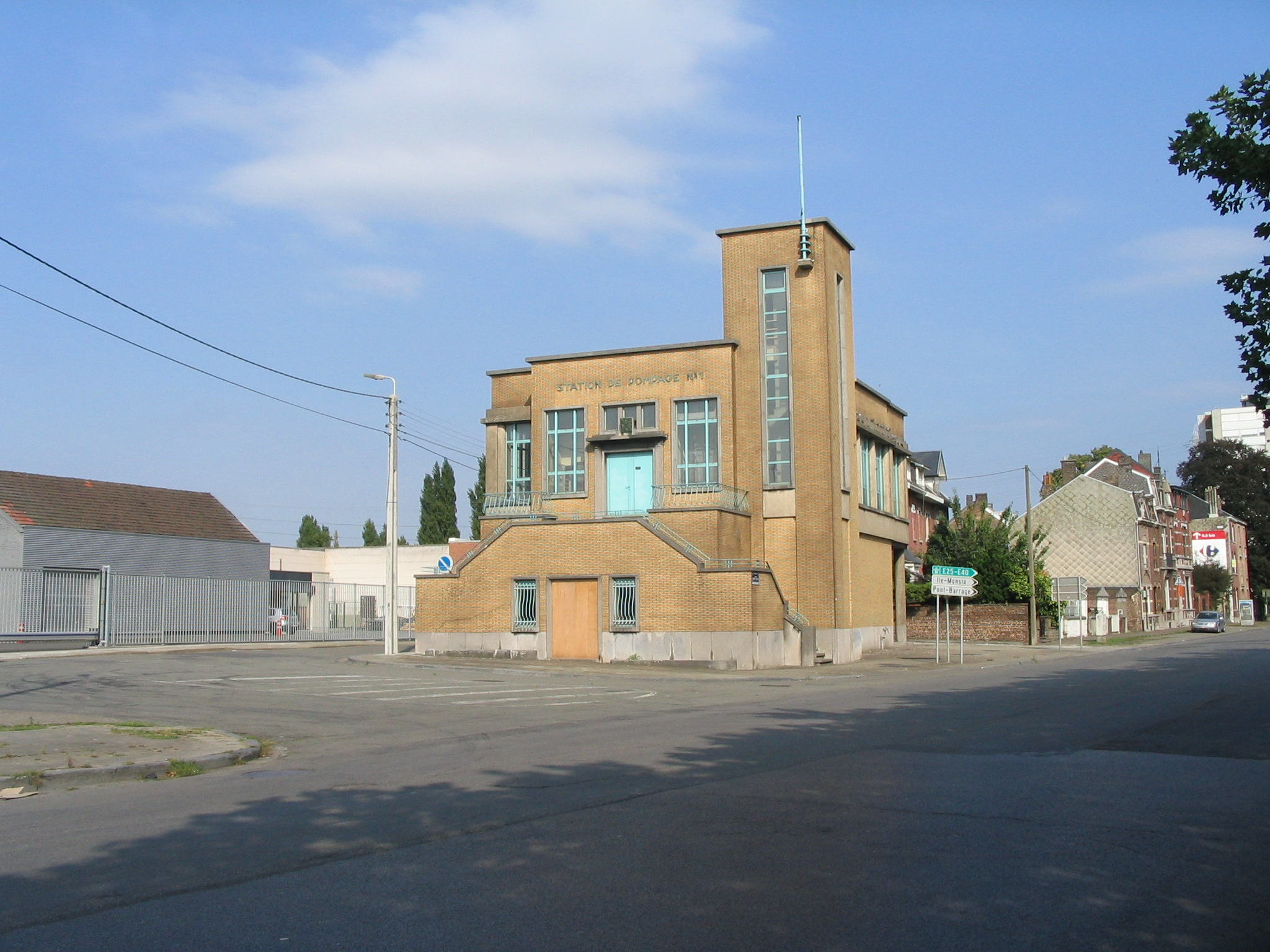
Pumping station No. 1 in Herstal, similar to the old stations located on the left bank of the Meuse in Flémalle.

Flémalle is part of the Lower Meuse sub-basin. The municipality has only one navigable waterway, the Meuse, which traverses the municipality from west to east over a length of 7,646 meters. It has seven main watercourses (excluding the Meuse, these are the Awirs, Ville-en-Cours, Neuville, Pré Renard, Broussou, Bailesse, and Croisette) with a total length of 27,051 meters. The municipality has 4% of its territory designated as flood zones, of which only 2.7% are at high flood risk.

The organization managing the municipality's sanitation services is the Association intercommunale pour le démergement et l'épuration (AIDE). In 2008, 77% of the population's domestic wastewater was not treated by a public treatment plant. In the same year, the municipality had a sewer network 158.24 km long.

In 2017, AIDE requested a budget from SPGE (the Public Water Management Company) for a study on the climate resilience of structures located on the left bank of the Meuse, including pumping stations No. 1 and No. 3 in Flémalle, which are old.

Since the winter of 1977–1978, there has been a gradual rise in the water table related to the post-coal mining era in the province of Liège. Flémalle and other municipalities along the Meuse with a mining history are affected by this phenomenon.

==== Islands ====
Before the construction of the quays along the Meuse in 1937, numerous islands of varying sizes were scattered throughout the river. These islands once formed the "Chokier bottleneck", a challenging section for both upstream and downstream navigation. Before the development works, archaeological remains were found, including gladii, funerary urns, and coins. Some of the islands included Rensonnet, Champs de Bures, Trou des Veaux, Avocat, and one near Ivoz. There were no bridges connecting the shores, so crossing the river was done by boat.

=== Climate ===
According to the Köppen-Geiger classification, Flémalle's climate is of type Cfb. On average, the temperature is 10.2 °C. However, attention should be paid to the municipality's morphology. The Meuse valley is at a lower altitude than the northern and southern parts of the municipality, which means that during moderate snow periods, snow falls across most of the territory except in the center, that is, along the Meuse where it is warmer.

On average, April is the driest month, with 65 mm of precipitation, while December is the wettest with an average of 99 mm. The temperature curve inversely follows the precipitation curve, with a slight delay. Thus, July is generally the warmest month with an average temperature of 18.1 °C, and the coldest is January with an average temperature of 2.6 °C. On average, it rains 10 days per month in the municipality, slightly more than in Liège.

Climate data for Flémalle
Month	Jan	Feb	Mar	Apr	May	Jun	Jul	Aug	Sep	Oct	Nov	Dec	Year
Mean daily maximum °C (°F)	4.9 (40.8)	5.9 (42.6)	9.7 (49.5)	13.8 (56.8)	17.3 (63.1)	20.4 (68.7)	22.2 (72.0)	21.7 (71.1)	18.6 (65.5)	14.3 (57.7)	9.1 (48.4)	5.7 (42.3)	13.6 (56.5)
Daily mean °C (°F)	2.6 (36.7)	2.9 (37.2)	5.8 (42.4)	9.4 (48.9)	13.2 (55.8)	16.3 (61.3)	18.1 (64.6)	17.7 (63.9)	14.7 (58.5)	11.1 (52.0)	6.7 (44.1)	3.5 (38.3)	10.2 (50.3)
Mean daily minimum °C (°F)	0.4 (32.7)	0.2 (32.4)	2 (36)	4.8 (40.6)	8.7 (47.7)	11.6 (52.9)	13.8 (56.8)	13.5 (56.3)	11 (52)	8.2 (46.8)	4.4 (39.9)	1.4 (34.5)	6.7 (44.0)
Average precipitation mm (inches)	87 (3.4)	77 (3.0)	78 (3.1)	65 (2.6)	72 (2.8)	83 (3.3)	84 (3.3)	87 (3.4)	72 (2.8)	71 (2.8)	82 (3.2)	99 (3.9)	957 (37.6)
Average relative humidity (%)	85	83	78	72	72	72	72	74	77	81	87	86	78

== Urban planning ==
=== Urban morphology ===
==== Urban fabric ====
The center of Flémalle is part of the continuous urban fabric of Liège, extending from Herstal to the village of Chokier. Almost the entire territory is part of this urban fabric, except for Awirs, Gleixhe, En Cowa, Ramioul, and Gros-Chêne, which are separate. Most of Flémalle's institutions are located in the center, mainly along the Grand'Route. These include the post office (formerly the finance building), the town hall, as well as the main commercial arteries and industrial hubs, while the police station of the zone of Flémalle is located near National Road 677, north of Trixhes. This neighborhood forms a separate urban fabric, with high levels of urbanization.

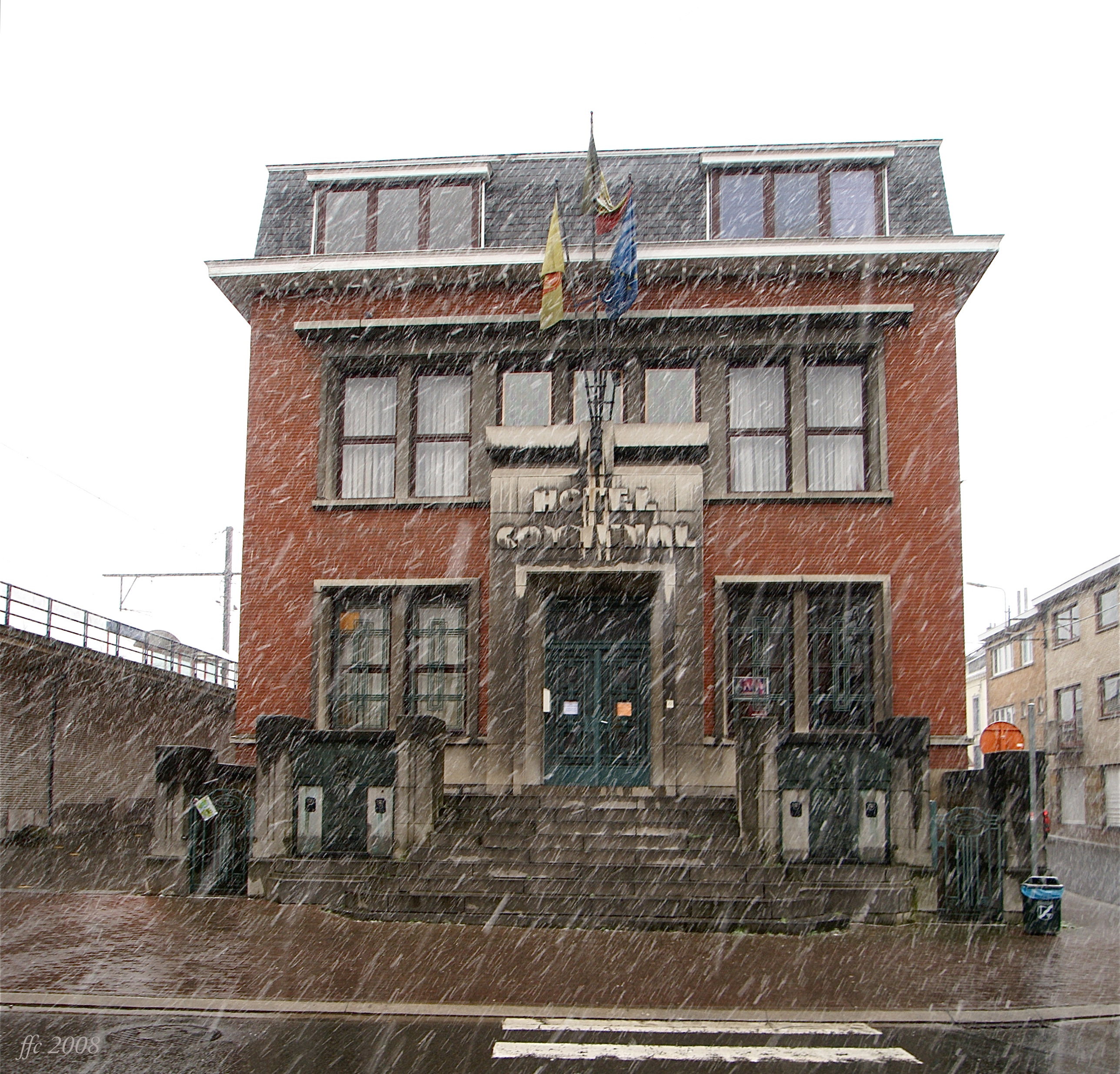
The former town hall when Flémalle-Grande was a separate municipality before 1977. Today, the building is used by both the municipality and the region.

Before the 1977 merger of Belgian municipalities, the current municipal sections were separate communes, which is why after the merger, institutions like libraries were numerous and spread across the territory. Today, everything has been centralized (two libraries, including a main one). There are still old buildings that once served as town halls. The Chokier district is easily recognizable by its history and architecture. It is often cited as one of the most beautiful villages in Wallonia. The Awirs district is also distinctive, with its castle. The Cultural Center and the main sports and charitable institutions are located south of the Trixhes district.

==== Land Use ====
Land use (percentage) as of 1 January 2020, compared to the province of Liège and Wallonia.
Land Use Type	Flémalle	Province	Wallonia
Share of artificial land area	27.7%	12.9%	10.7%
Share of residential land	18.6%	7.6%	6.5%
Share of land occupied by commerce, offices, and services	0.7%	0.3%	0.3%
Share of land occupied by public services and community facilities	1.9%	1.6%	1.1%
Share of land for recreational use and urban green spaces	0.4%	0.6%	0.6%
Share of land occupied by agricultural buildings	0.4%	0.8%	0.6%
Share of land for industrial and artisanal use	4.1%	1.4%	1%
Share of quarries, landfills, and abandoned spaces	0.3%	0.2%	0.2%
Share of transport infrastructure	1%	0.5%	0.4%
Share of other artificial spaces	0.1%	0.1%	0%
Share of arable land and permanent crops	20.7%	22.2%	28.5%
Share of grasslands and fallow agricultural land	19.8%	27.2%	23.2%
Share of forests	15.4%	28.4%	29.3%
Share of semi-natural environments	5.6%	2.4%	2.5%
Share of wetlands	0%	1.1%	0.3%
Share of water surfaces	0%	0.2%	0.2%
Share of land of unknown nature (including uncategorized land)	10.7%	5.7%	5.2%
Source: Iweps – WalStat (The portal for local statistical information in Wallonia)

The table above shows that the municipality is highly urbanized, with an artificial land area and residential land nearly three times higher than those of Wallonia. Services, offices, and commerce also occupy a significant portion of the municipality. In the center of Flémalle, there are several large retailers (Delhaize, Lidl, Aldi), as well as two shopping centers, one to the east of the center, near Jemeppe, and a smaller one to the west of the center at Chaffours. Despite the significantly higher share of residential land compared to the Walloon and provincial averages, recreational areas and green spaces take up less space.

The industrial share is four times higher, which can be explained by the two ArcelorMittal centers located on the left and right banks of the Meuse and of considerable size, as well as the presence of three major industrial hubs: the Les Cahottes Economic Activity Park, the Arbre Saint-Michel Economic Activity Park, and the Ramet Industrial Park.

Despite the high urbanization of the municipality, agriculture occupies a significant portion of the land. Although it is less than the provincial and regional average, when comparing the municipality's share to that of Liège or the municipalities in the Liège agglomeration, Flémalle stands out.

Finally, the share of forests is significantly lower, almost half the Walloon average, which can be explained by increasing urbanization, the expansion of economic hubs, and agriculture, leaving little room for forests. Most of them are located in the south and west of the municipality.

=== Housing ===
Buildings by year of construction (percentage) as of 1 January 2020, compared to the Province of Liège and Wallonia.
Year of Construction	Flémalle	Province	Wallonia
Share of buildings constructed before 1900	21.9%	23.4%	27.7%
Share of buildings constructed between 1901 and 1918	10%	9.8%	9.7%
Share of buildings constructed between 1919 and 1945	11.9%	12.2%	11%
Share of buildings constructed after 1945	56.2%	54.6%	51.6%
Source: Iweps – WalStat (The local statistical information portal for Wallonia)

The share of buildings constructed before the end of World War II (1945) varies greatly between western and eastern Belgium. This is explained by the fact that the Province of Liège often found itself as the first city to face the German armed forces.

Flémalle is one of the municipalities with the highest proportion of buildings constructed between 1946 and 1961 (20.9%), whereas the regional average is no higher than 10.8%. This post-war construction phenomenon is found throughout the Liège region.

This construction trend continued between 1962 and 1970 with 11.5% of buildings erected compared to 7.7% for Wallonia. Since then, construction has decreased in Flémalle and the Liège region. The municipalities in the countryside have experienced a period of construction from the early 1970s to the present day, particularly in the Province of Luxembourg. This phenomenon is not limited to the Liège region but also occurs in Charleroi, Namur, Mons, and other major Walloon cities.

The proportion of buildings and apartment buildings among the housing stock stands at 15.5%. This proportion is expected to increase in the coming years due to the Flémalle-Neuve development project. This share is almost equal to the Walloon average (16.3%).

The Liège region, including Flémalle, has one of the highest proportions of terraced houses among the housing stock in Wallonia. These houses were often former workers' homes from the coal mining industry during the Industrial Revolution and the operation of various mines and quarries.

In 2001, the municipality had 10,757 housing units for 25,777 inhabitants.

==== Architecture ====
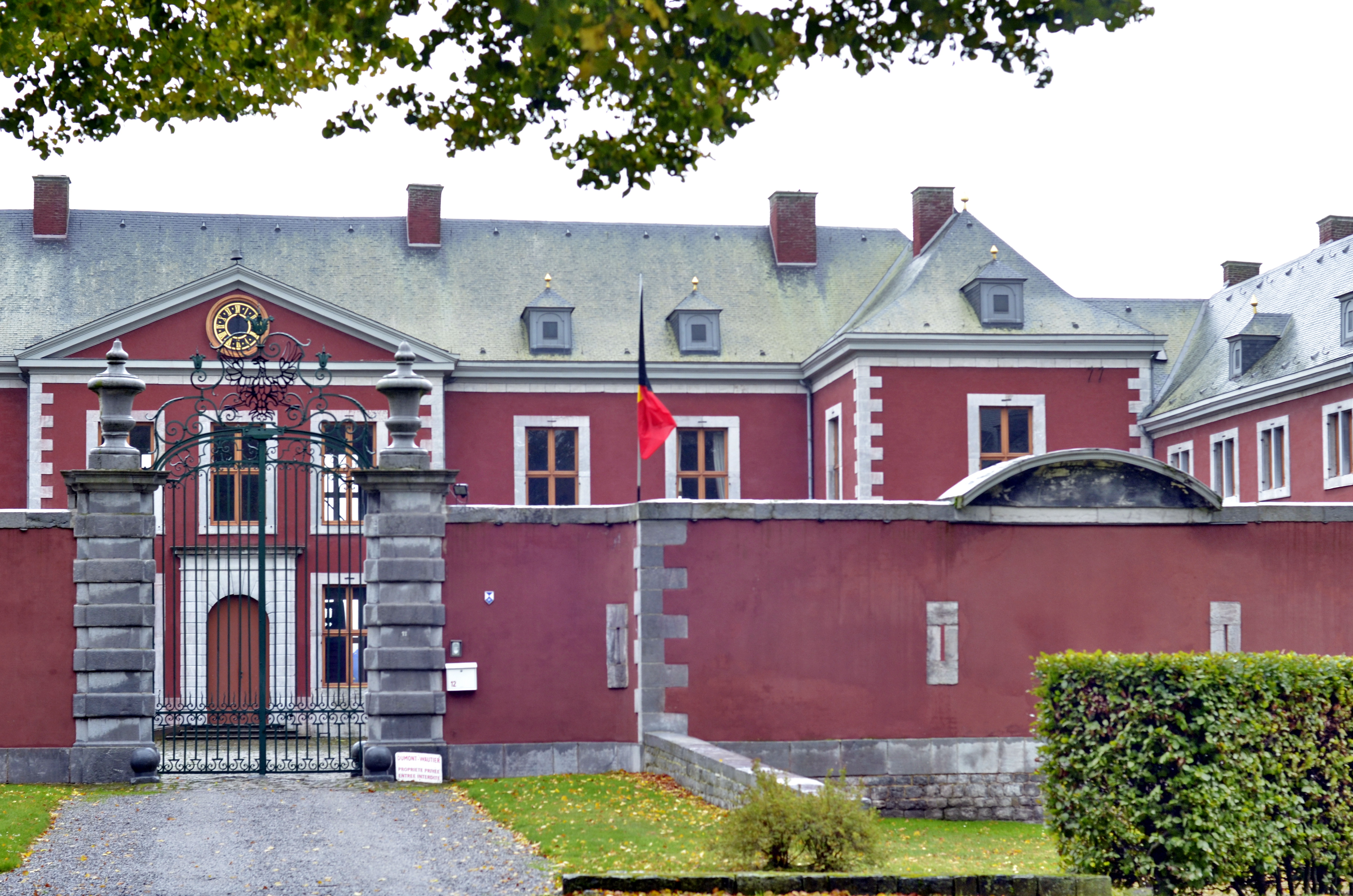
The entrance to the Château d'Aigremont.

Liège architecture is distinguished by the Rhenish Romanesque and Mosane style. The Château d'Aigremont is a beautiful example, in Louis XIV style but mixing the Mosane style with the red bricks found at the Grand Curtius, another specimen of the Mosane style.

The Chokier district has a well-preserved architectural heritage similar to what is found in most important Walloon villages.

The Trixhes represent a new architectural style of the 20th century, the modernist style.

=== Development projects ===
The municipality is looking to the future with Flémalle 2030. Among the revitalization projects:

- Renovation of the Grand'Route and its two projects.

The first project, Flémalle-Centre, aims to revitalize the municipal park, the green lung of the town center, as well as create a new public space at the Athénée Provincial Guy Lang and the Tubemeuse polyclinic (Bois de l'Abbaye Hospital), located across from each other. This project includes the creation and reorganization of parking areas, with the initial offer being very limited. This will enhance the town center where schools, shops, the library, the socio-economic center, municipal administrations, the Flémalle-Centre police station, the municipal park, and the fire station are located.

The second project, concerning Flémalle-Grande, will revitalize the S. Donnay square, the "Flémalle Shopping" shopping center, and parking areas.

- Flémalle-Neuve

This project aims to redevelop an area behind the Tubemeuse and includes the creation of 238 housing units (184 apartments and 54 houses), a new municipal school, and new offices as well as SMEs. The area will also have a new railway station on the Line 125A towards Seraing and Liège, as well as a footbridge over the Meuse, next to the railway bridge.

This project is currently in the study phase with a study on land pollution. It is estimated at 72 million euros.

- Modernization of the Trixhes

This modernization project is intended to redevelop the entire district, including various roads and pedestrian areas, improving commercial, cultural, and social offerings, and addressing the high demand for housing in Flémalle. The neighborhoods of Unit IV have been vacant for several years but are still developable. The XV Bonniers will see about thirty new housing units.

- Eco-neighborhood of Mons-lez-Liège

Since the demolition of the old municipal school located at Place Mottard, the neighborhood has experienced disorganization despite its densification. The project aims to redevelop this square, with the creation of shops and housing, as well as a more sustainable mobility around the square. In fact, a whole eco-neighborhood will be created.

- Sustainable Urban Development with sustainable methods

Flémalle aims to implement sustainable development methods by managing various aspects of urban planning and the environment, including the development of eco-districts and promotion of green spaces.

During the removal of the ashes, Engie found asbestos and therefore decontaminated the site. This discovery worried local residents who feared the possible consequences for their health but analyses showed that asbestos was present in low quantities and posed no risk. The asbestos is being treated, and clean soil is separated from asbestos-contaminated soil.

The mayor of Engis, Serge Manzato, participates in the meetings of the Steering Committee. Indeed, the Hénâ site is located right next to the municipality of Engis.

In March 2016, 50% of the first phase of the work was completed. In April 2016, the conveyor belt began to be constructed (a helicopter was present for some maneuvers of the large-scale project) and air quality checks started and will be carried out throughout the project. In May 2017, 2% of the ashes were removed, which represents 20 barges. In October 2017, 4% of the ashes were removed and 63 barges departed for cement manufacturers. In January 2018, more than 5% of the ashes were removed, filling 100 barges. In June 2018, 170,000 tonnes were evacuated. In March 2019, 285,000 tonnes were evacuated. In November 2019, 420,000 tonnes were evacuated, representing 18% of the ashes, with 285 barges sent to the Liège cement manufacturers.

=== Industrial risks and pollution ===
In 2009, there were no SEVESO sites in the municipality. The European Pollutant Release and Transfer Register (E-PRTR) listed four sites: ArcelorMittal Steel Belgium S.A. Eurogal (metal surface treatment); ArcelorMittal Steel Belgium S.A. Flémalle Ramet (galvanization); Electrabel Centrale des Awirs (combustion); Segal S.A. (hot-dip galvanizing of steel sheets). In 2004, there were two nuclear zones distributed across the municipal territory.

In 2007 and 2009, there was a site to be redeveloped (SAR) whose cleanup was recognized as a priority (Cokerie Flémalle), five landfills of which three were unrehabilitated, and five service stations with potentially contaminated soil out of 12 service stations.

=== Power plant ===
From 1951 to 2020, there was a coal-fired power plant in Flémalle that generated electricity. Since 2026, there is a Combined-cycle gas-and-steam power plant operated by Engie. It has a capacity of up to 875 megawatts.

=== Transportation and Communication Routes ===
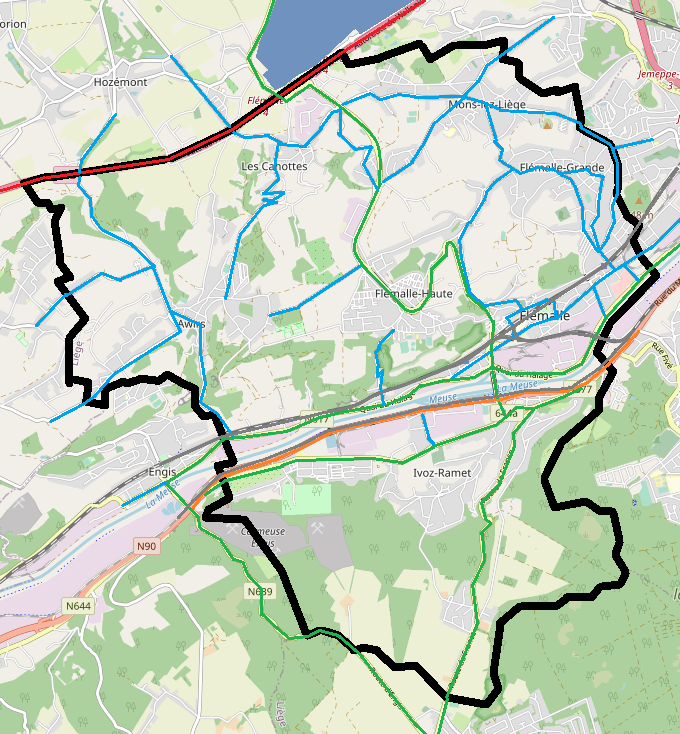
The road and rail network of Flémalle: Flémalle boundaries Motorway Major road Primary network Secondary network Railways

Flémalle is a municipality located a few kilometers from Liège and Seraing, situated in an important urban and economic hub. To the north of the municipality is the European route E42, which separates the municipality from the Liège Airport, in the center, the developed quays of the Meuse, and to the south, a national road connecting the Condroz municipalities.

==== Road Network ====
The road network in Flémalle is quite unique. The main connections run from west to east, with some major roads extending from the left bank of the Meuse to the north and only one running from the Meuse to the south of the municipality. The rest of the network, both tertiary and secondary, revolves around the various urban and economic hubs of the region. In the eastern part of the territory, a more complete secondary and tertiary network is found due to its proximity to Seraing.

The Walloon Motorway acts as a border with Grâce-Hollogne. The National Route 677 connects the entire municipality to the motorway, via exit 4 (Flémalle), which also allows passage under the motorway to reach the airport and Horion-Hozémont. This same national road serves Mons-lez-Liège and Les Cahottes via a roundabout, Les Trixhes and the center of Flémalle, and continues to Ivoz-Ramet passing over the weir. It climbs up the south of Flémalle, known as Route de France, passing through Gros-Chêne. It ends at the intersection with Route du Condroz (N63) just past the center of Neuville-en-Condroz. A 2x2 lane tunnel allows passage under the Thier des Trixhes.

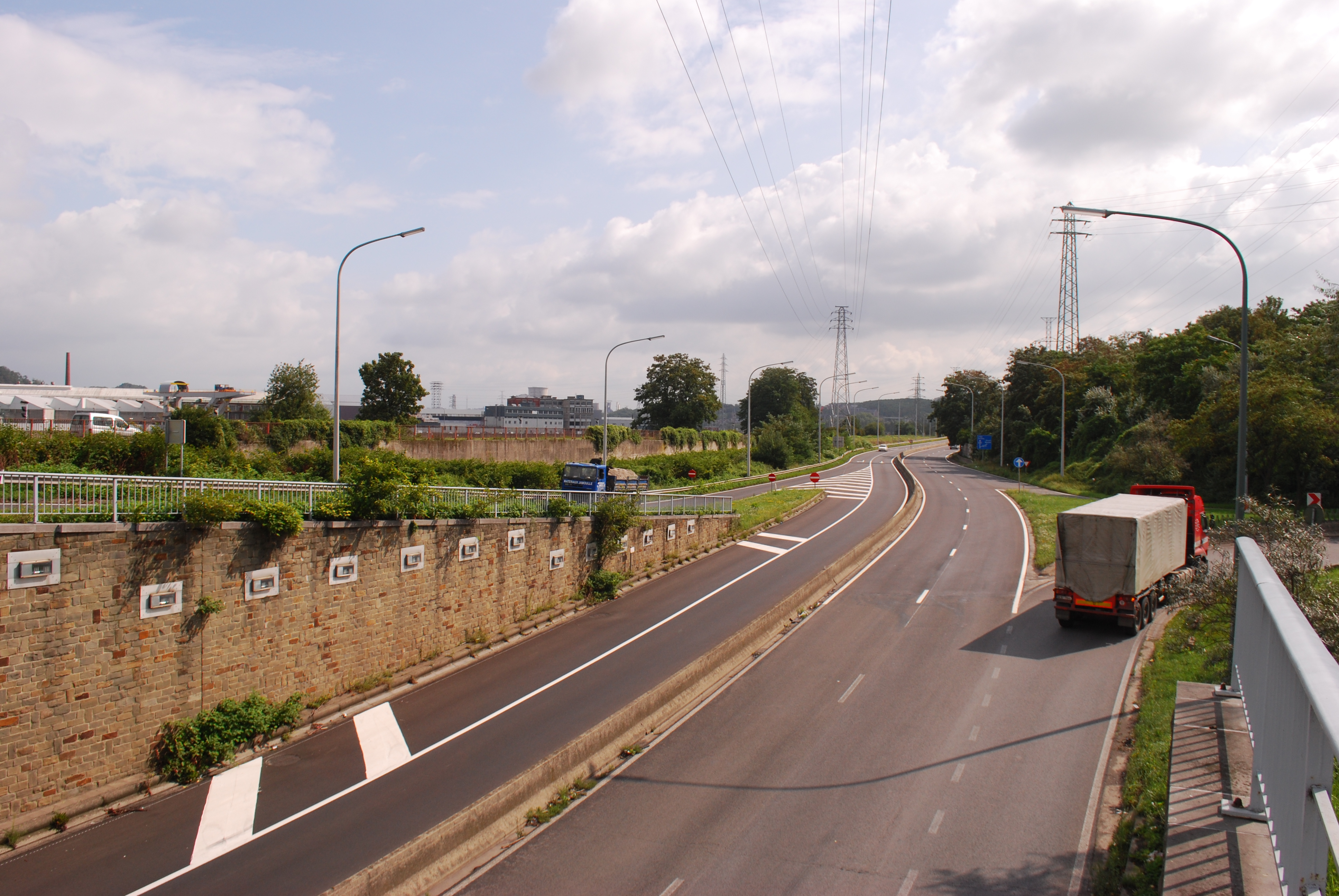
The National Route 90 from National Route 677, above the trémie, towards Liège.

National Route 90, which connects Huy to Liège, runs along the right bank of the municipality. It connects Engis to the ArcelorMittal site in Ramet, Ivoz, the center of Seraing, and Liège. National Route 617 connects Engis to Jemeppe-sur-Meuse, passing by the Tubemeuse site of the ArcelorMittal group, known as Quai du Halage. With this national road and National Route 90, Chaussée de Ramioul, continuing from those of Ramet and Ivoz, also follows a west-to-east direction and connects Engis to Ramioul, Ramet, and Ivoz to Val Saint-Lambert, Seraing.

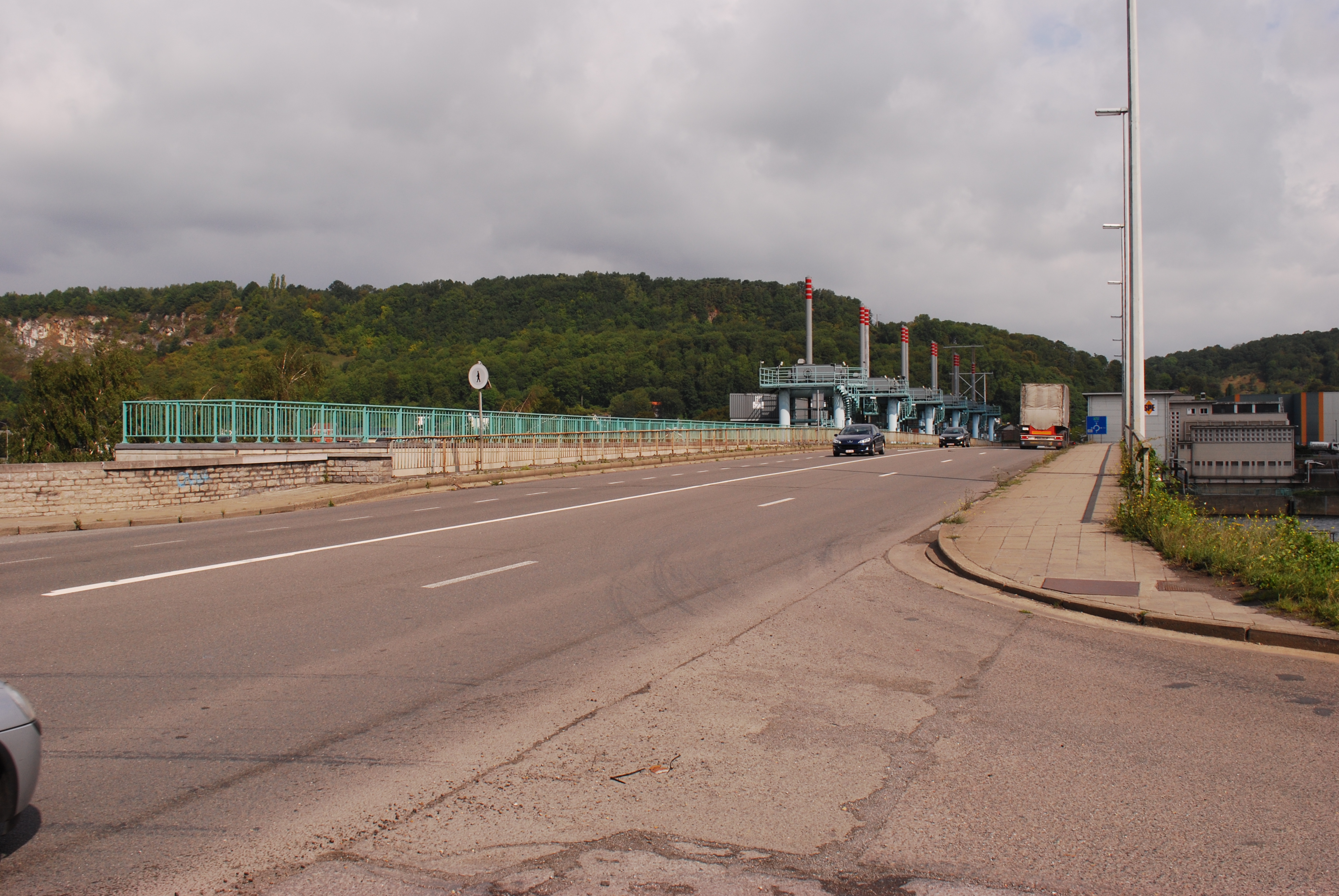
National Route 677 on the Ivoz-Ramet Weir, towards European Route E42.

Other significant routes include Rue des Awirs (connecting Engis to Awirs up to Hozémont passing through Gleixhe under the motorway), Rue d'Otet (connecting Les Trixhes to the Awirs), Rue de l'Alouette, Jean-Louis Adam, E'Tiyou, Harckay (connecting exit 4 to Jemeppe passing through Mons-lez-Liège), Rue du Thier Saint-Léonard (connecting Mons-lez-Liège to Hollogne-aux-Pierres), Rue de Flémalle-Grande and Rue de la Fontaine (forming a large roundabout in one-way traffic connecting the bottom of Flémalle-Grande to Profondval), and Grand'Route (serving the entire center of Flémalle).

Flémalle's Road Network Compared to the Walloon Road Network (2005)
Category	Municipal Territory		Wallonia
Category	Length (km)	Density (km/km2)	Density (km/km2)
Motorways	2.5	0.07	0.05
Regional Roads	25.6	0.70	0.45
Municipal Roads	251.2	6.85	2.86
Total	279.3	7.61	3.36

The town of Flémalle commissioned the sculptor Robin Vokaer to create a masterful piece, Le Cœur in steel, installed at exit 4 of the E42 highway. (GPS Coordinates: 50°37’28.5″N 5°25’46.2″E).

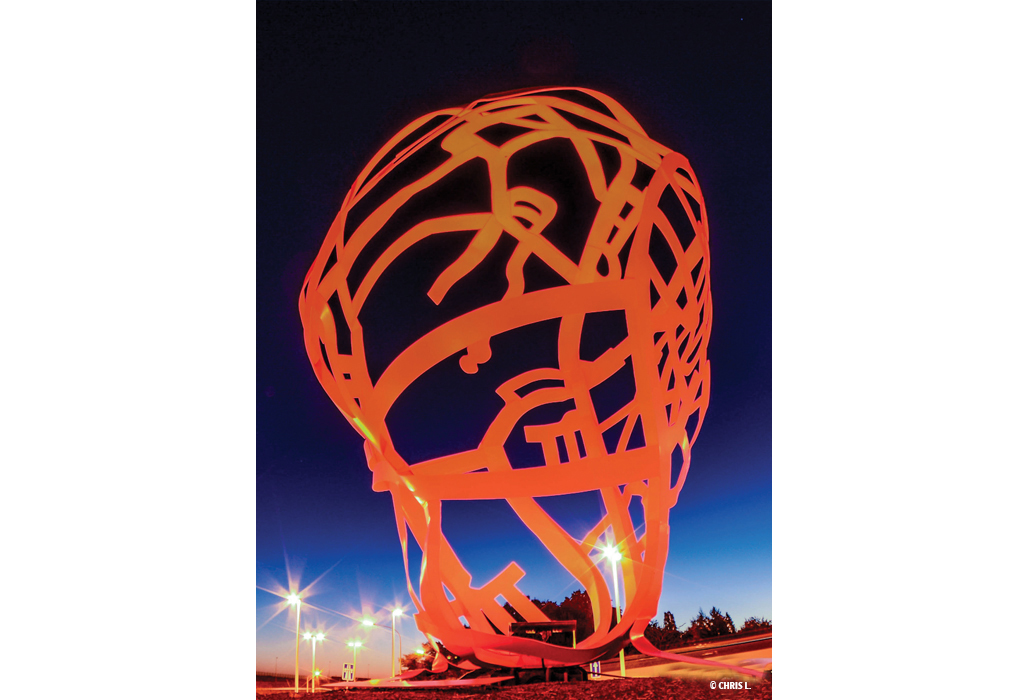
Le Cœur, created for the municipality of Flémalle. Exit 4 of the E42 highway. GPS Coordinates: 50°37’28.5″N 5°25’46.2″E

==== Bridges ====
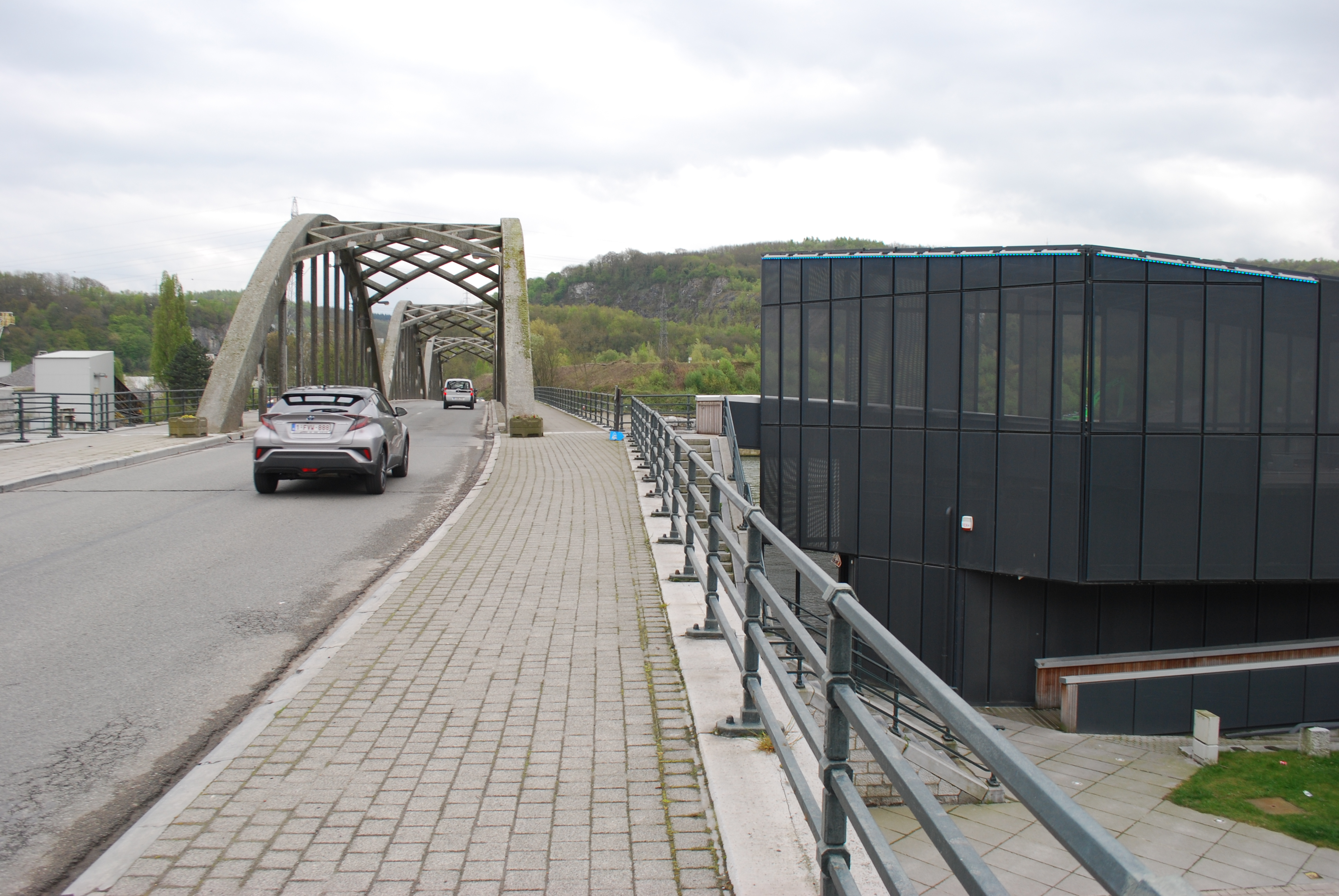
The Engis bridge with its stairwell on the right, heading south from Flémalle.

Despite the reasonable width of the Meuse River, only two bridges span the river within Flémalle's territory: the Ivoz-Ramet dam bridge and a railway bridge. Another bridge, the Val Saint-Lambert bridge, once spanned the Meuse but was destroyed. A footbridge is expected to be put into service after the construction of the new Flémalle-Neuve neighborhood. Besides these bridges, the Engis bridge, located a little over 500 meters west of the municipality, can be mentioned.

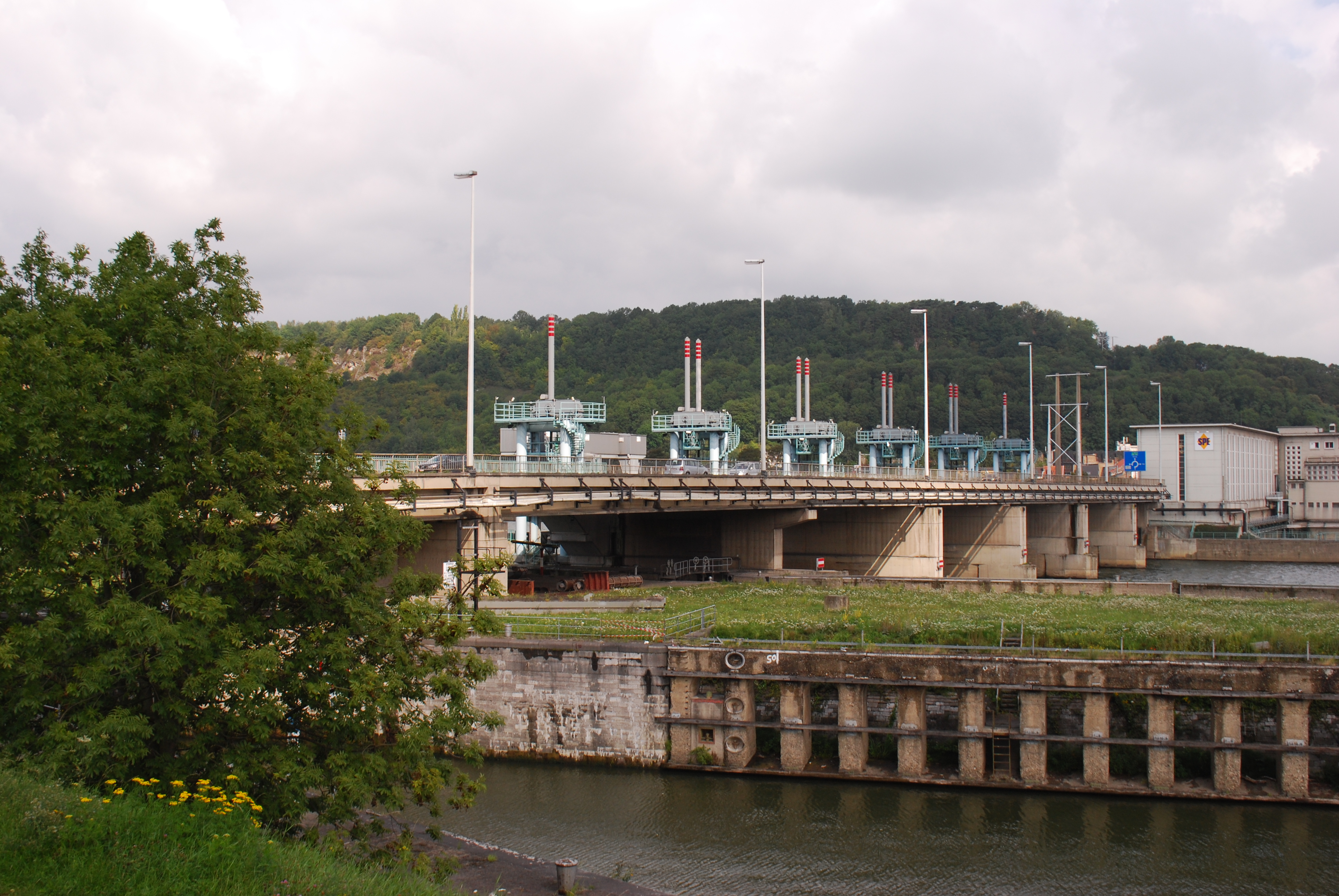
The Ivoz-Ramet dam bridge from the right bank of the Meuse. In the background, on the right, the hydroelectric power station.

The Ivoz-Ramet dam bridge is a structure built between the 1960s and 1980s; the initial structures were destroyed during World War II. The dam bridge was not yet a bridge but was equipped only with locks. On the left bank of the Meuse, there is a hydroelectric power station fed by the dam. It is the most frequented hydraulic structure in the Walloon navigable network. Between 2010 and 2014, it was renovated to allow for increasing river traffic.

The railway bridge supports both freight train and passenger train traffic. The bridge crosses the Meuse and the Quai du Halage, heading towards the Tubemeuse site of ArcelorMittal, the Flémalle-Haute and Leman stations, towards Flémalle, and the Seraing station, towards Seraing.

The Val Saint-Lambert bridge was a stone bridge built by the Compagnie du Nord Belge in 1846. The bridge was a railway bridge with a unique feature, a toll for pedestrians crossing to work at the Cristalleries.

The only drivable bridge in the municipality is separated by orthodromic distances of 4.1 km from the Engis bridge and 4.5 km from the Seraing bridge.

==== Rail Network ====
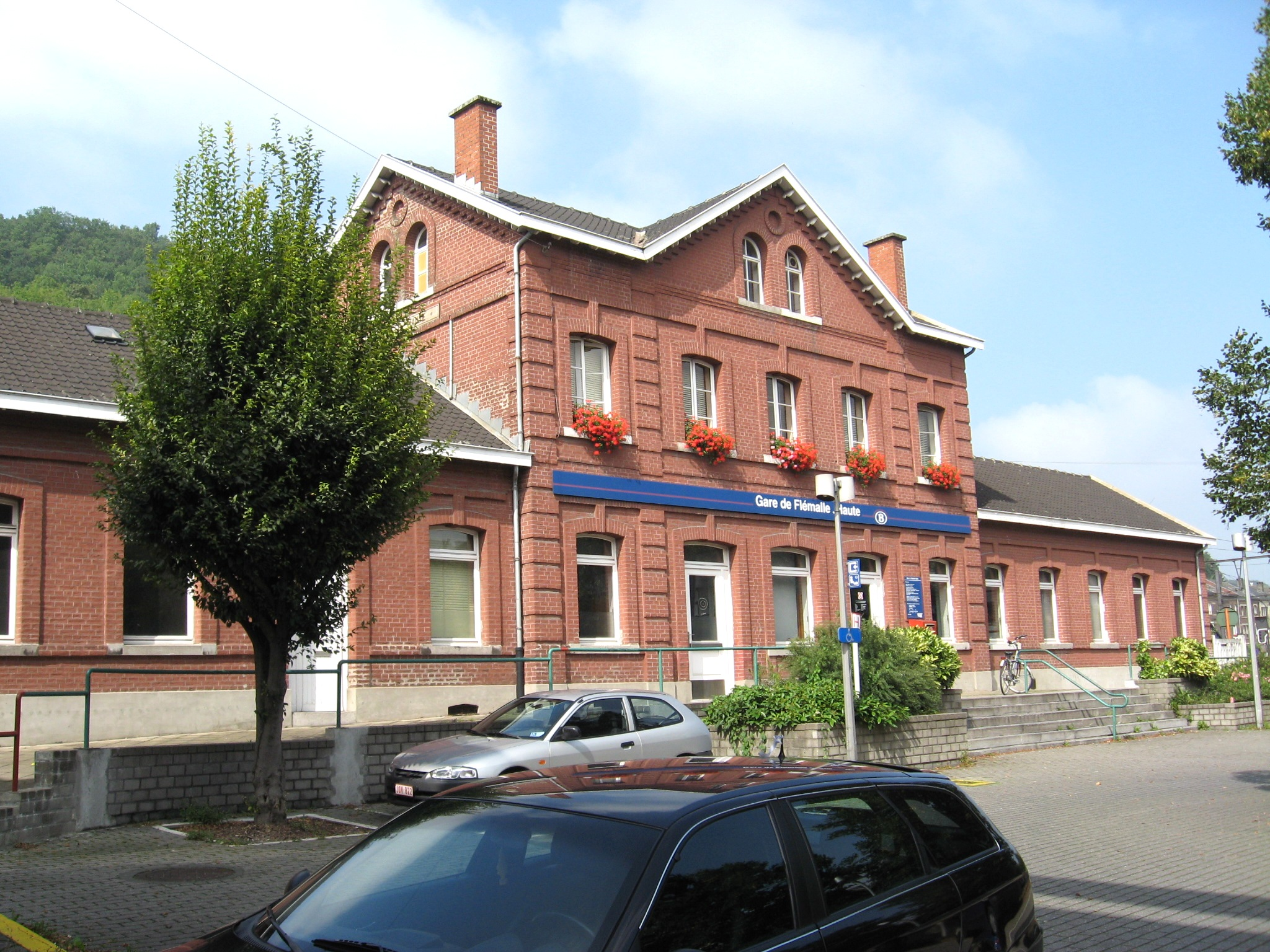
Flémalle-Haute station, the only example of this architectural style in Belgium.

Flémalle is at the junction of the railway lines from Namur to Liège and Liège to Flémalle. The Flémalle-Haute station is the only station on the Flémalle-Liège line, while the Namur-Liège line has three Flémalle stations. Between 2003 and 2005, an average of 1,292 passengers used the Flémalle stations, and in 2006, there were 1,523.

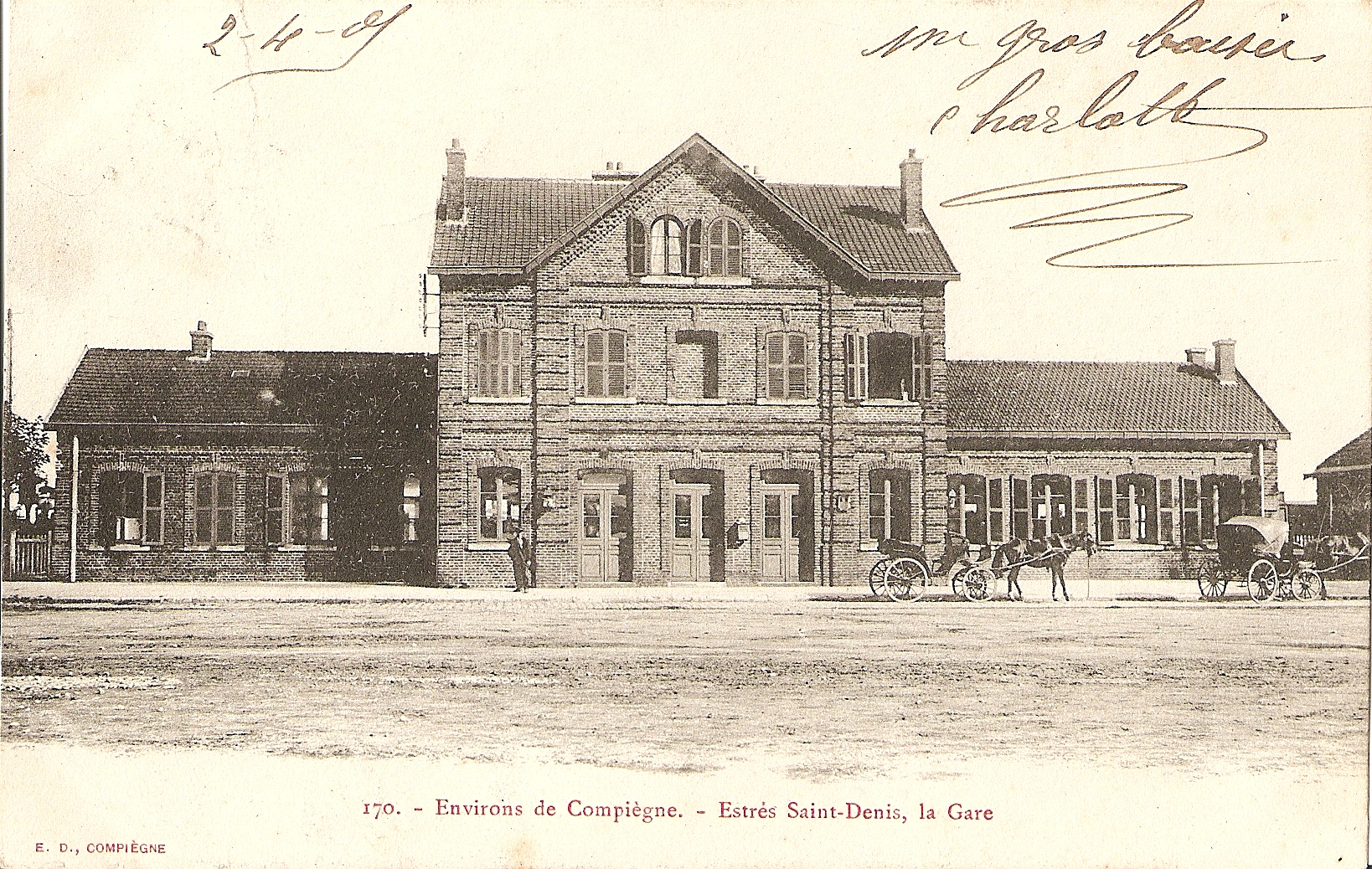
Estrées-Saint-Denis station on a postcard, an exact replica of Flémalle-Haute station.

Flémalle-Haute station is operated by the National Railway Company of Belgium (SNCB) and is served by InterCity (IC), Suburbans (S), Omnibus (L), and Peak Hour (P) trains. The passenger building is the only one of its kind in Belgium, although similar buildings exist in some regions of France (such as Estrées-Saint-Denis station). It was inaugurated on 18 November 1850. Since the building has been empty for several years, an urban development project has been proposed, and housing is expected.

The Leman station is served by Omnibus (L) and Peak Hour (P) trains. It is located at kilometer point (PK) 10.0 on the Liège to Namur line, just after Flémalle-Haute station. It is named Leman in honor of General Leman, a Liège hero of World War I.

The Flémalle-Grande station is served by the same trains as Leman station and is located at kilometer point (PK) 9.3 on the same line preceding Leman station. The following station is Jemeppe-sur-Meuse. The station is located near a shopping center with a Carrefour, a Krëfel, a Lunch Garden, and other stores.

In the Flémalle-Neuve development project, a new station will be built on the Liège-Seraing-Flémalle line, making it the fourth station in the municipality over 5.7 km of railways, or one station approximately every 1.5 km.

These two lines provide access to the Guillemins station in Liège in about ten minutes. Given that this station is a major railway hub in the country, it can be concluded that Flémalle stations are well served.

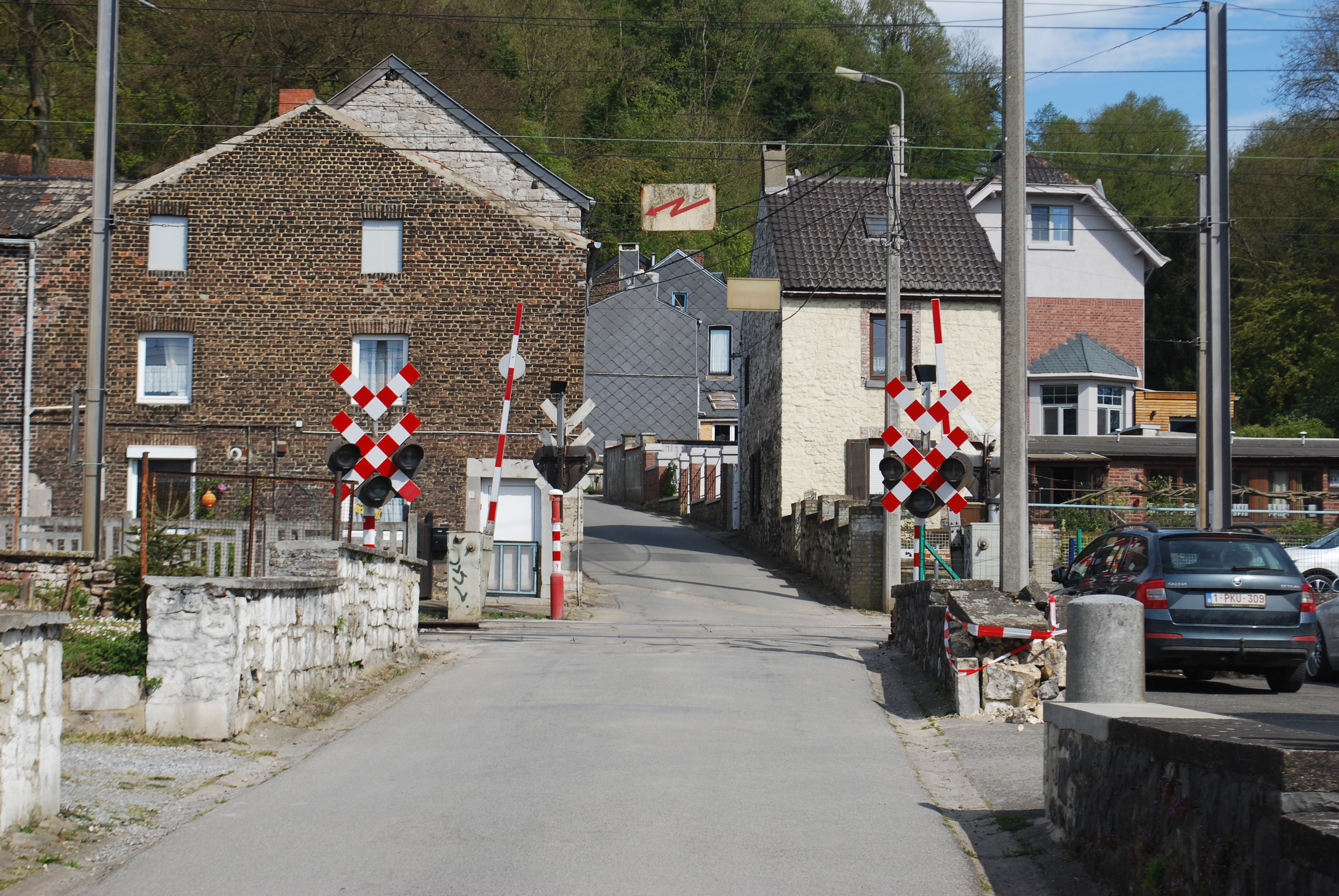
The Chokier level crossing, one of the most accident-prone in Belgium.

The municipality has two level crossings, one of minor importance and the other cutting Chokier in two. The latter is problematic. It is the third most accident-prone level crossing in Belgium; over the past ten years, there have been four accidents, two of which were fatal. Infrabel, which manages the railway network infrastructure, would like to remove the level crossing by creating a tunnel a few hundred meters further, but the municipality is opposed to this project because the part of the village on the north side of the railway would be isolated from the rest of the municipality. The mayor, Isabelle Simonis, said that "removing the level crossing [...] seems to be a radical solution". The controversy surrounding the level crossing dates back to Sunday, 10 January 2016, when a woman was struck by a train. This fatal accident sparked a debate since it was not the first fatal accident. The level crossing provides access to Houlbouse Street, which is frequently used as a shortcut to descend from the Trixhes plateau.

The rail network of Flémalle compared to the Walloon rail network (2008)
Category	Municipal Territory		Wallonia
Category	Length (km)	Density (km/km^{2})	Density (km/km^{2})
Conventional Lines	5.7	0.15	0.08
Freight Lines	8.5	0.23	0.02
High-Speed Lines	0	0	0.01
Total	14.2	0.39	0.10

==== Air Network ====
Liège Airport is located to the north of the municipality, less than 100 meters away, in the territory of Grâce-Hollogne. Primarily focused on cargo transport, the airport also offers a few tourist destinations, which have been declining year by year. Indeed, cargo handling has become increasingly significant at the airport, making it the seventh-largest airport for cargo in Europe. Due to its geographical location between Paris, Brussels, Antwerp, Rotterdam, the Ruhr region, Luxembourg, and Switzerland, the airport has become a hub and was chosen as a reference hub for Europe during the COVID-19 pandemic in the spring of 2020, and was awarded the title of "Best Cargo Airport in the World for 2020" that same year.

Flémalle benefits economically from this with several economic and industrial zones, including the Arbre Saint-Michel zone, a few hundred meters from the airport, where transportation companies, online businesses, and large companies like Mithra are located.

In addition to the economic development of the municipality, some local areas, such as Les Cahottes or En Cowâ, experience noise pollution from both the highway and the airport. The consequences are visible when walking through the streets of Cahottes, with many abandoned houses bought by the airport and some demolished. One of the most striking consequences is the abandonment and destruction of the village of Rouvroy in Grâce-Hollogne, located on the other side of the highway.

This noise pollution tends to drive residents away from these areas; some have moved to Donceel, but airport development has brought noise there as well.

==== Waterway Network ====
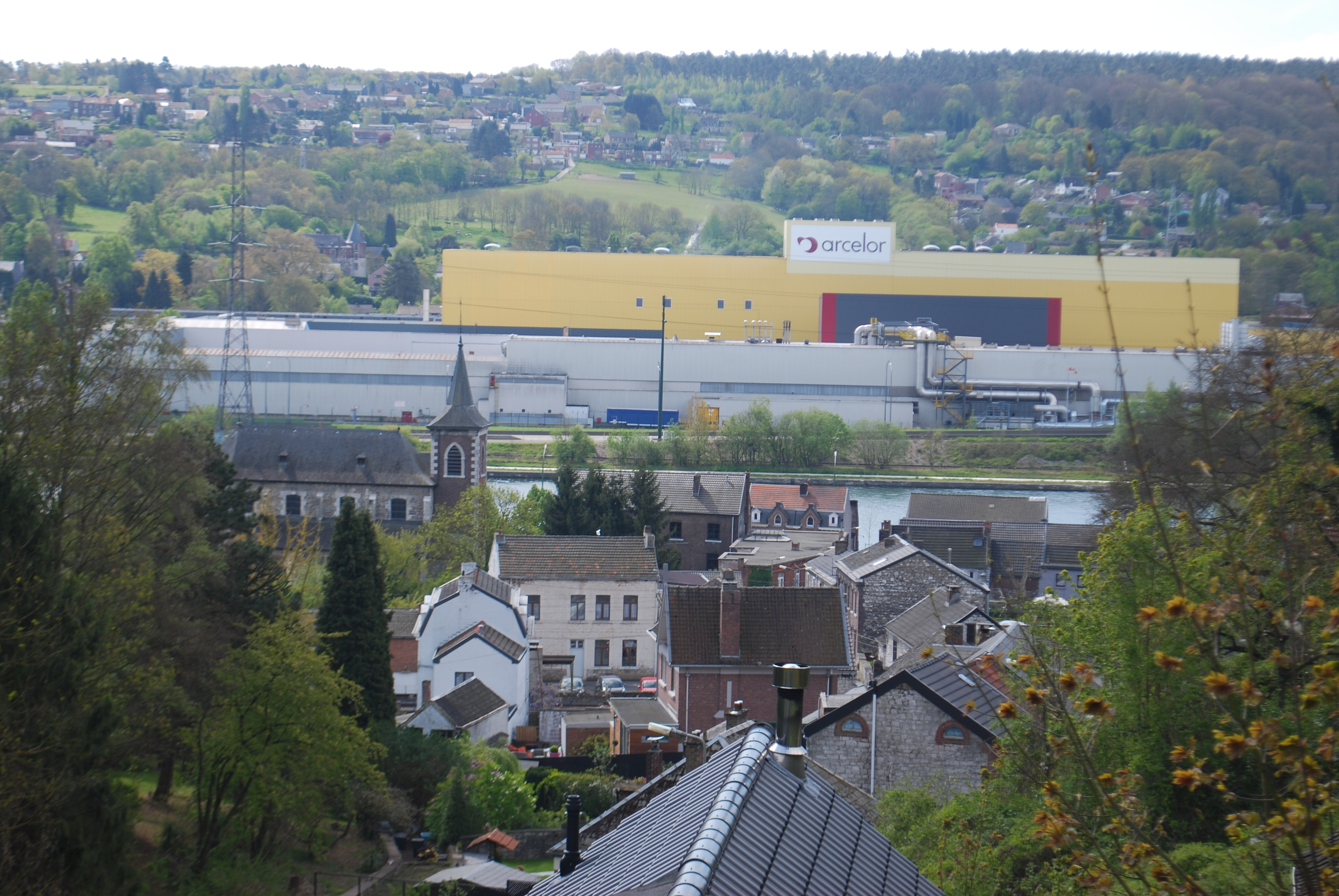
View of the ArcelorMittal site near the dock, along the Meuse and the freight railway, from above the village of Chokier.

Flémalle is traversed from east to northeast by the Meuse. The river provided strong economic appeal to the municipality in the past, with activities related to coal mining, coal mines, and the metallurgy and steel industry. In addition to this rich history, the municipality today experiences another form of activity along the Meuse. Indeed, as the decline of ArcelorMittal's sectors accelerates in Belgium, the municipality has turned towards the autonomous port of Liège, the third-largest river port in Europe. Therefore, redevelopment work was carried out between 2010 and 2014 on the Ivoz-Ramet weir, to streamline river traffic and allow the passage of larger vessels.

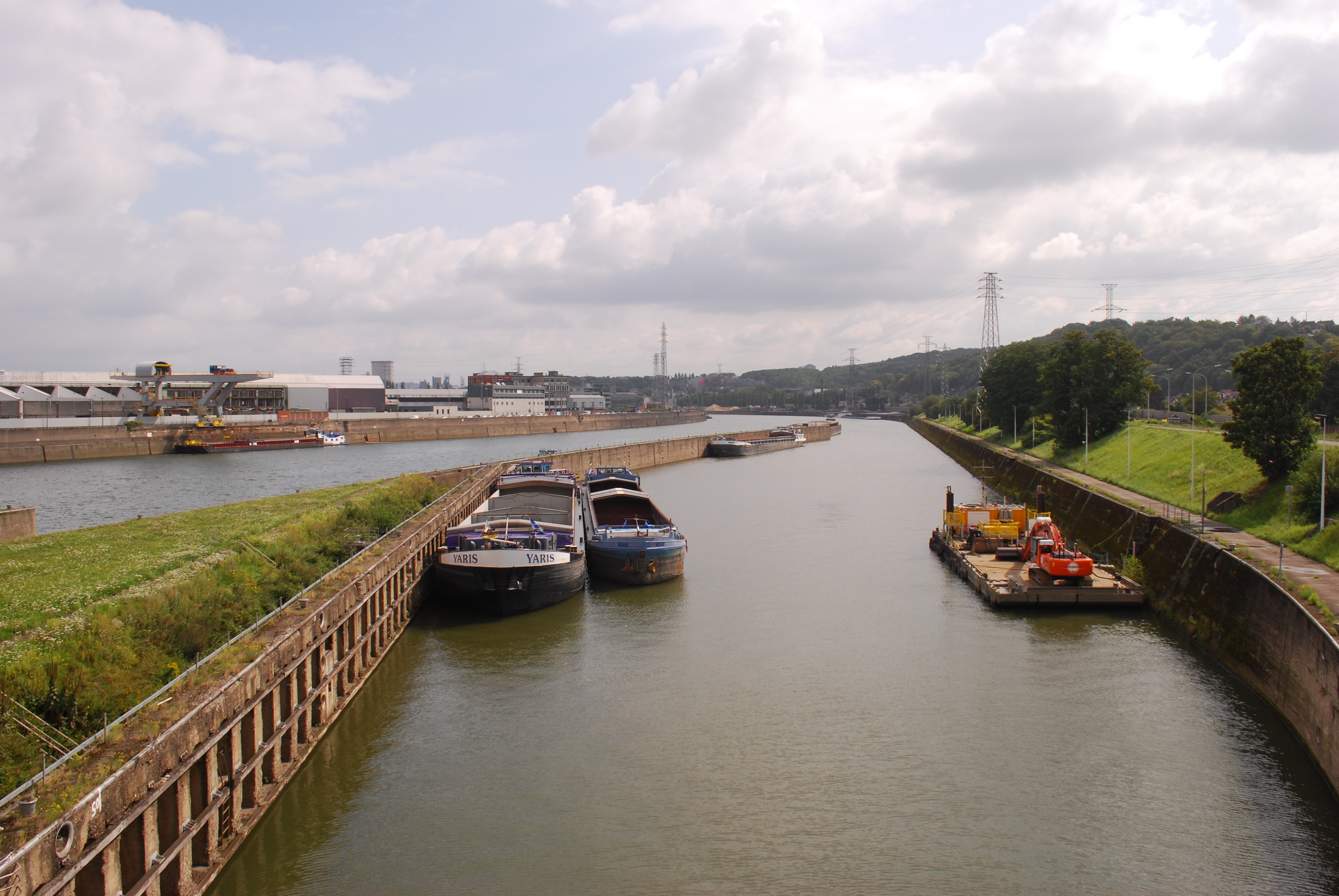
View of the weir locks and industrial center, on the left, towards Liège.

The Flémalle port areas associated with the autonomous port of Liège are the Awirs port (left bank), the Flémalle port (right bank), and the Ivoz-Ramet port (right bank) shared with Seraing.

The Meuse is bordered on both sides by National road 617 and 90. Upstream and downstream along the Meuse, you can find the quarry Carmeuse Engis (the port is located in Engis, and quarrying is on both communes), the biomass power plant of the Awirs (left bank, currently being converted into a gas power plant), the Yacht Ski Club Flémalle (left bank), the Intermunicipal Waste Treatment Association of the Liège Region (right bank, along the dock), Segal, ArcelorMittal, and Arceo (right bank, near the dock), Inter Beton (left bank), the Ivoz-Ramet weir with its two locks and the hydroelectric plant (left bank), the Arcelor group and an economic center with several industries (left bank), and the Ivoz-Ramet port (right bank).

The Meuse is the only navigable river in the municipality.

==== Cycling Network ====
The cycling network in the municipality is poorly arranged due to the topography of the area. Only the lower part, the Trixhes plateau, and the Awirs center would be easily navigable by bike.

The RAVeL network is present in the municipality, with the RV8b connection, a road link running behind the railway south of Awirs, going up to National road 617 to Chokier, and then following the railway line up to Jemeppe via small roads in the municipality. There is also the EV19 connection, from Engis to the weir, passing through Ramioul, Ramet, and Ivoz. The most important cycle path is the RAVeL along the Meuse, partially following the quays up to Engis, connecting Namur to Liège. This RAVeL shares its cycle path with the EuroVelo 3, linking Trondheim (Norway) to Santiago de Compostela (Spain).

There are several paved and unpaved paths throughout the municipality, allowing for relative accessibility for short trips.

There are several cycling clubs of all types in Flémalle.

==== Pedestrian Network ====
There are pedestrian networks in some areas of the municipality. For example, in Trixhes, there is a particularly developed network in the city, passing under National road 677 to connect with other nearby places. There are other paths outside Trixhes connecting cul-de-sacs to the rest of the road network. In the project to redevelop the town center, significant emphasis is given to pedestrians. Sidewalks are generally well-maintained.

==== Public Transport Network ====
Flémalle is served by numerous bus lines operated by TEC. There are five terminal zones: Arbre Saint-Michel, the cultural center, Chaffours, Gros-Chêne, and the Cité. The lines connect to Liège, Seraing, Boncelles, the bus station in Jemeppe, the center of Flémalle, Amay, Saint-Georges, Huy, the Fagnes (Engis), Verlaine, and other medium-sized hubs. The territory east of National road 677, Les Trixhes, Chokier, and Ivoz are in zone 20, allowing easy transit to Liège and its most populous suburbs, while the rest of the municipality, i.e., west of the national road, Ramioul, Ramet, and Gros-Chêne, is located in zones 30 and 37 of the network. All lines are part of the TEC Liège-Verviers subsidiary. In 2009, there were 86 bus stops distributed across the territory.

=== Former Public Transport Networks ===
==== Liège Vicinal Tramway ====
The vicinal tramway was a former tramway network connecting Liège and its suburbs. The only line passing through Flémalle was the one from Jemeppe to Hannut, which passed through Mons-lez-Liège, then known as Mons-Crotteux. It was in service between 1905 and 1906 and was discontinued on 13 September 1959.

The line also passed through Fexhe-le-Haut-Clocher, Engis, Ampsin, and Verlaine.

A street in Mons-lez-Liège is named rue du Vicinal and provided access to the former coal mines of Arbre-Saint-Michel. A vicinal stop was located in Les Cahottes.

==== Liège-Seraing Economic Railways and Extensions (RELSE) ====
The Liège-Seraing Economic Railways and Extensions company was established in 1881 and disappeared in 1961. The line between Liège, Seraing, and Flémalle was newly opened in 1941 and closed 20 years later.

The line connected Place de la République française to Flémalle-Haute station.

==== Seraing Trolleybus ====
Flémalle was served by two trolleybus lines operated by the Liège-Seraing Economic Railways and Extensions (RELSE). One line connected the center of Seraing to Place François Gérard in Ivoz-Ramet, opposite the weir, and the other line connected the place to the Prayon Rupel factory in Engis and Saint-Georges-sur-Meuse.

The line connecting to the Prayon Rupel factory crossed the weir, passed in front of Flémalle-Haute station, and went through the village of Chokier.

== Politics ==
Flémalle, as the municipality exists since the 1977 municipal merger, has had four mayors, three men and one woman. These four mayors were or are members of the Socialist Party. Indeed, Liège and its region, including Flémalle, are a red stronghold, meaning that most politics is centered around the PS which is the majority in almost all municipalities (10 out of 24 in the Liège administrative arrondissement are not predominantly PS: Aywaille, Chaudfontaine, Dalhem, Esneux, and Neupré have an MR majority, Bassenge has a Democratic Humanist Centre and MR majority, Comblain-au-Pont is predominantly cdH although governed under the Communal Interests like Fléron, Juprelle, and Soumagne. Thus, the suburbs of Liège are sometimes referred to as the Red Belt.

In recent years, the Workers' Party of Belgium (PTB) has seen a surge in votes in the municipality and in Wallonia. The Reformist Movement (MR), while popular in some municipalities of the arrondissement due to Didier Reynders, a national-level politician born in Liège and a member of MR, has only managed to secure one seat out of the 29 in the municipality.

The municipality is thus situated on the left side of the political spectrum with the PS in the leading position, securing more than half of the seats (17 out of 29), followed by the PTB (5 seats), Ecolo (3 seats), the IC (3 seats), and the MR (1 seat).

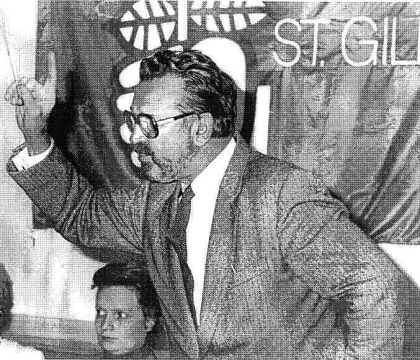
André Cools at the house of the people in Saint-Gilles is an iconic figure of the municipality, a monument in the municipal park is dedicated to him.

=== List of Mayors ===
- André Cools, from 1977 to 1991: André Cools was a politician born in Flémalle who held a prominent place in Belgian politics, serving as Minister of Budget, Deputy Prime Minister, President of the Belgian Socialist Party, and President of the Walloon Parliament. He was mayor of the municipality from the merger until his assassination on 18 July 1991 in Liège.
- Jean Beulers, from 1991 to 2000: Jean is the son of Hubert Beulers, a Walloon socialist politician.
- Gilbert Van Bouchaute, from 2000 to 2006: Gilbert Van Bouchaute is a Belgian socialist. After serving as mayor for six years, he has since distanced himself from the political scene.
- Isabelle Simonis, from 2006 to 2022: Isabelle Simonis initially served as Walloon MP. During her term as mayor, she became Secretary of State for Families and Disabled Persons, President of the Parliament of the French Community, and Minister of Social Promotion, Youth, Women's Rights, and Equal Opportunities of the French Community.
- Sophie Thémont, since 2022: First alderwoman, she succeeded Isabelle Simonis following her departure.

=== Municipal Administration ===
==== Municipal College ====
For the 2018–2024 legislature, the municipal college consists of seven members: the mayor (Isabelle Simonis, PS), five aldermen (Sophie Thémont, PS; Fabian Pavone, PS; Jérôme Dister, PS; Frédéric Vandelli, PS; Marc D'Joos, PS) and the president of the Public Centre for Social Action (Marie-Hélène Joiret, PS).

==== Municipal Council ====
For the 2018–2024 legislature, the municipal council is composed of the mayor, the five aldermen, and the president of the CPAS as well as 22 municipal councilors (Laurent Léonard, PS; Valter Poleses, PS; Jeanine Wintgens, Ecolo; Jean-Denis Lejeune, IC; Véronique Passani, PS; Amir Hamidovic, PS; Fabienne Dantine, PS; Dominique Perrin, Ecolo; Stéphane Ancia, Reformist Movement; Dominique Bodarwe, PS; Jean-Marie Noville, IC; Victor Kadima Bafwa, Ecolo; Valérie Heuchamps, PTB; Maria Teresa Fernandez Navarro, PS; Marie-Ange Jolis, PTB; Georges Thirion, PTB; Yves Thomas, PTB; Ingrid Rosar, PTB; Joseph Tita, PS; Daniel Renkin, PS; Cédric Marchandise, IC; Viviane Lambert, PS) and the General Director (Pierre Vryens).

=== Administrative and Electoral Attachments ===
As of 1 January 2021, Flémalle belongs to the administrative entities, from the largest to the smallest, of the Kingdom of Belgium (11,507,163 inhabitants), the Walloon Region (3,645,107 inhabitants), the Liège Province (1,107,937 inhabitants), the Liège administrative arrondissement (623,673 inhabitants), and the municipality of Flémalle (26,366 inhabitants).

In terms of the judicial, it belongs to the Liège administrative and judicial arrondissement and the Grace-Hollogne administrative and judicial canton.

=== Associated Organizations ===
- AIDE

Flémalle is part of the Intermunicipal Association for Drainage and Purification (AIDE). The municipal councilor Dominique Perrin represents Flémalle on the board of directors as a member. Prior to him, it was the first alderman Sophie Thémont who held this position (she was also a member of the executive board). Flémalle, like Herstal, Liège, Oupeye, Saint-Nicolas, Seraing, Visé, the Province of Liège, and the SPGE, is a member of the intermunicipal drainage system.

As of 31 December 2019, an investment dossier was under study for various infrastructures in Flémalle related to AIDE, amounting to €1,750,300. At the same date, projects were underway in the municipality amounting to €1,579,632.96. A significant portion of this was for the installation of collectors during the development of Grand'-Route. Other projects under study, including collectors, a pumping station in Chokier, or water catchments (13 projects), represent a cost of €11,960,000. Additional projects under construction as of 31 December 2019, including the upstream extension of the Awirs collector, the Bobesses stream collector, the Dommartin pumping station, and a new fiber optic network, will cost €4,208,425.46.

Works on the pumping station of Jemeppe and various other works in Flémalle cost €9,962,413.72.

Following the commissioning of the Sur-les-Bois and Broussous pumping stations (Saint-Georges-sur-Meuse and Flémalle), the Stockay station had to be dismantled.

- CHBA

The Centre Hospitalier du Bois de l'Abbaye (CHBA), with its main site in Seraing, includes a site in Flémalle. The site offers appointments in cardiology, physical medicine and rehabilitation, medical imaging, and dentistry.

- CHR

Flémalle is associated with the intermunicipal Regional Hospital Center (CHR) of the Citadelle de Liège, along with fifteen other municipalities.

- CILE

The municipality is a member of the Liège Intermunicipal Water Company (CILE). It was established on 27 December 1913.

- ECETIA

On 28 May 1985, the municipality of Flémalle, along with Amay, Dison, Grâce-Hollogne, Huy, Liège, Seraing, and the Province of Liège, created the Société Liégeoise de Financement et d'Economies d'Energie (SLF). ECETIA Intermunicipal is dependent on it and helps associated municipalities with real estate leasing and leasing.

- ENODIA

Enodia, formerly known as Publifin, is a pure financing intermunicipal (IPF). The municipality is associated with 73 other municipalities, the Province of Liège, and the Walloon Region.

This intermunicipal is particularly known for its political-financial scandal. This affair came to public attention through revelations by Le Vif/L'Express. The newspaper reported that representatives of the intermunicipal were paid to attend meetings that they did not actually attend. Representatives were paid €500 per minute for meetings they did not attend.

Catherine Magali, a Flémalle political figure from the PS, received €111,997 for six meetings.

Following this affair, the current mayor of Flémalle, Isabelle Simonis, had to resign from her federal mandate.

- IILE-SRI

The zone de secours Liège 2 IILE-SRI is the Intermunicipal Fire Service of Liège and Surroundings (IILE-SRI). This emergency zone covers 21 municipalities and includes a central station and six outposts (fire stations), one of which is located in Flémalle.

Flémalle joined the intermunicipal on 1 January 2010, along with Crisnée.

- INTRADEL

Flémalle has been part of Intradel since 2011. This intermunicipal plays a leading role in environmental matters. As of 1 January 2021, baby diapers must be disposed of in the trash for residual waste rather than in the organic waste bin as previously.

Since 1 December 2019, the municipality has introduced a new blue trash bag for the collection of PMC. This system allows for better recycling of plastic packaging.

In March 2019, with Intradel's support, the recyparcs of Flémalle 1 and Hannut began testing the recovery and reuse of objects in good condition. This helps reduce waste in recyparcs.

The municipality has two recyparcs, one located at Ivoz-Ramet, the other at Arbre Saint-Michel.

- SPI

The intermunicipal of Services Promotion Initiatives in the Province of Liège (SPI) has existed since 1961.

The Phenix area, located in Flémalle, belongs to the intermunicipal. This site houses 16 companies, including ArcelorMittal Liège SA. This site has been and will continue to be partially rehabilitated.

Other sites include the Cahottes site with 60 companies, the Ivoz-Ramet site with 31 companies, and the Arbre Saint-Michel site.

SPI also participated in the construction of the new Prehistoric Museum and in protecting a part of the old museum's collection during the renovations.

- Various Intermunicipals

Flémalle is part of the intermunicipals IMIO, INTERSENIORS, NEOMANSIO, and RESA. Interseniors is responsible for several retirement homes and long or short-term care facilities in the municipality. RESA manages the municipality's electricity.

=== Twin towns ===
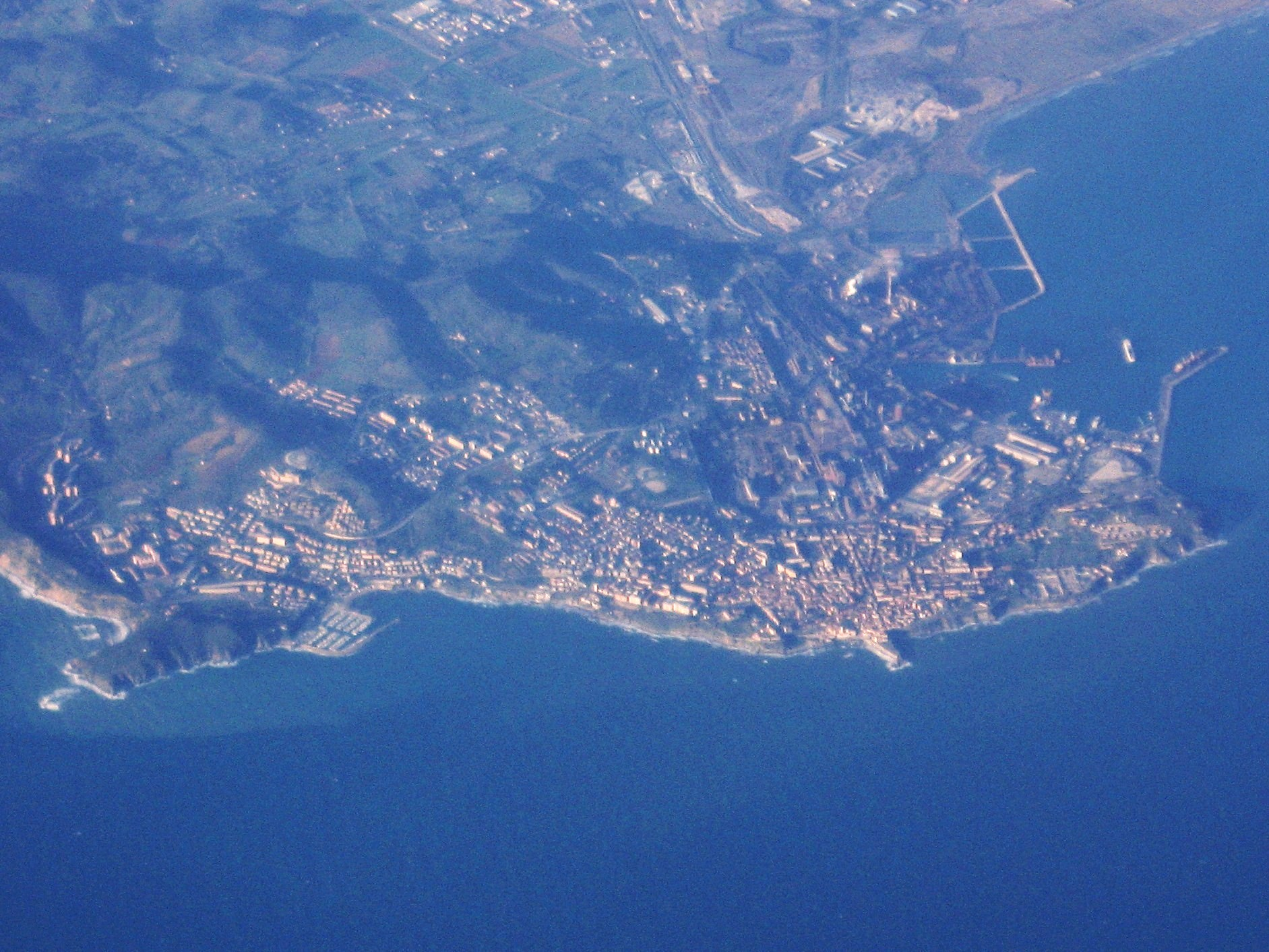
Piombino, Flémalle's first twin town.

The municipality is twinned with two Italian municipalities, Piombino in 1971 and Basiliano in 2017.

The twinning with Piombino was initiated by a Piombinese who moved to Flémalle. The project was accepted by the mayor at the time, André Cools. This twinning was based on tourist and cultural exchanges between the Tuscan municipality and the Mosane municipality. The 40th anniversary of the twinning was celebrated in 2011.

The twinning with Basiliano, a municipality in Friuli-Venezia Giulia, is more recent. It originated from the initiative of several residents who had been organizing sports exchanges for over 30 years. The twinning charter was signed on 7 December 2017.

The municipality has also created a partnership with the municipality of N'Djili in the Democratic Republic of Congo as part of an International Municipal Cooperation (IMC) program.

== Demographics and society ==
=== Demographics ===
As of 2024, the municipality was the 101st most populous in Belgium. In 2024, it was the 26th most populous in Wallonia and the 5th in the province of Liège.

Taking into account the former municipalities involved in the 1977 municipal merger, the population trend is as follows:

Historical population

Year	Pop.	±%
1831	6,453	—
1846	8,983	+39.2%
1856	10,380	+15.6%
1866	11,322	+9.1%
1880	14,527	+28.3%
1890	16,726	+15.1%
1900	19,797	+18.4%

Year	Pop.	±%
1910	21,622	+9.2%
1920	21,802	+0.8%
1930	23,811	+9.2%
1947	24,006	+0.8%
1961	27,852	+16.0%
1970	28,771	+3.3%
1981	28,217	−1.9%

Year	Pop.	±%
1990	26,557	−5.9%
2000	25,777	−2.9%
2010	25,016	−3.0%
2020	26,389	+5.5%
2024	27,002	+2.3%

The figures for the years 1846, 1900, and 1947 include the figures for former merged municipalities.
Source: DGS – Note: 1831 to 1981 = census; from 1990 = number of inhabitants on 1 January

It is noted that from 1995 to 2008, the population of Flémalle decreased, losing nearly 2000 inhabitants during this period. However, from 2008 to 2020, the population grew consistently, with significant growth particularly from 2008 to 2014. This demographic growth is a general trend observed across Belgium. From 2008 to 2014, Belgium's population increased by nearly 500.000 inhabitants, a rise of about 5%. However, from 2014 onward, this growth has slowed, and the population of Flémalle has tended to stabilize with some slight increases.

=== Society ===
Information about local organizations and other social elements such as the number of inhabitants are available in related sections of the articles concerning the municipality and its local institutions.

=== Socio-economics ===
==== Average Income ====
In 2018, the average income per inhabitant in neighboring municipalities was, in ascending order and in euros, 14,275 for Seraing, 15,645 for Grâce-Hollogne, 15,907 for Engis, 18,182 for Saint-Georges-sur-Meuse, and 24,855 for Neupré. The people of Flémalle earn 16,553 euros, placing them between Engis and Grâce-Hollogne, while the national average is 18,768 euros, with Neupré being the only municipality exceeding this average by a significant margin.

This socio-economics is comparable to other urban regions in the country where generally, people with lower incomes live in suburban areas, such as Seraing or Grâce-Hollogne, while wealthier populations prefer to live outside the city on higher grounds, as seen in Neupré and Saint-Georges-sur-Meuse. This socio-economic phenomenon is also noticeable in Seraing, where the poorest population is located in the lower part of the municipality, i.e., the center, Ougrée, and Jemeppe-sur-Meuse, while the wealthier population resides in Boncelles.

The difference between Neupré and Flémalle is 8,302 euros, while the difference with Seraing is 2,275 euros. The average income per inhabitant in Flémalle increased by 3% compared to 2018 and has been rising annually since 2005.

==== Real Estate Prices ====
In 2018, there were 12,197 buildings in Flémalle, accounting for 22.5% of the territory being built. Among these buildings, there are apartments, townhouses, and Villas with a median price of 158,000 euros (235,000 for open-type villas, 158,000 for apartments, and 150,000 for closed or semi-closed type houses).

The national average for closed or semi-closed type houses is 216,500 euros and 315,000 euros for open-type villas. The real estate prices are thus below the national average. This can be explained by very low real estate prices in Wallonia compared to Flanders and the Brussels-Capital Region.

== Education ==
The municipality has 7 schools of free early childhood and primary education:

- Maurice Carême school (nursery)
- Notre-Dame school (nursery and primary)
- Sacré-Cœur Institute (nursery and primary)
- Saint John the Baptist school (primary)
- Saint Joseph Institute (nursery and primary)
- Saint Louis de Gonzague school (nursery and primary)
- Sainte Thérèse school (nursery and primary)

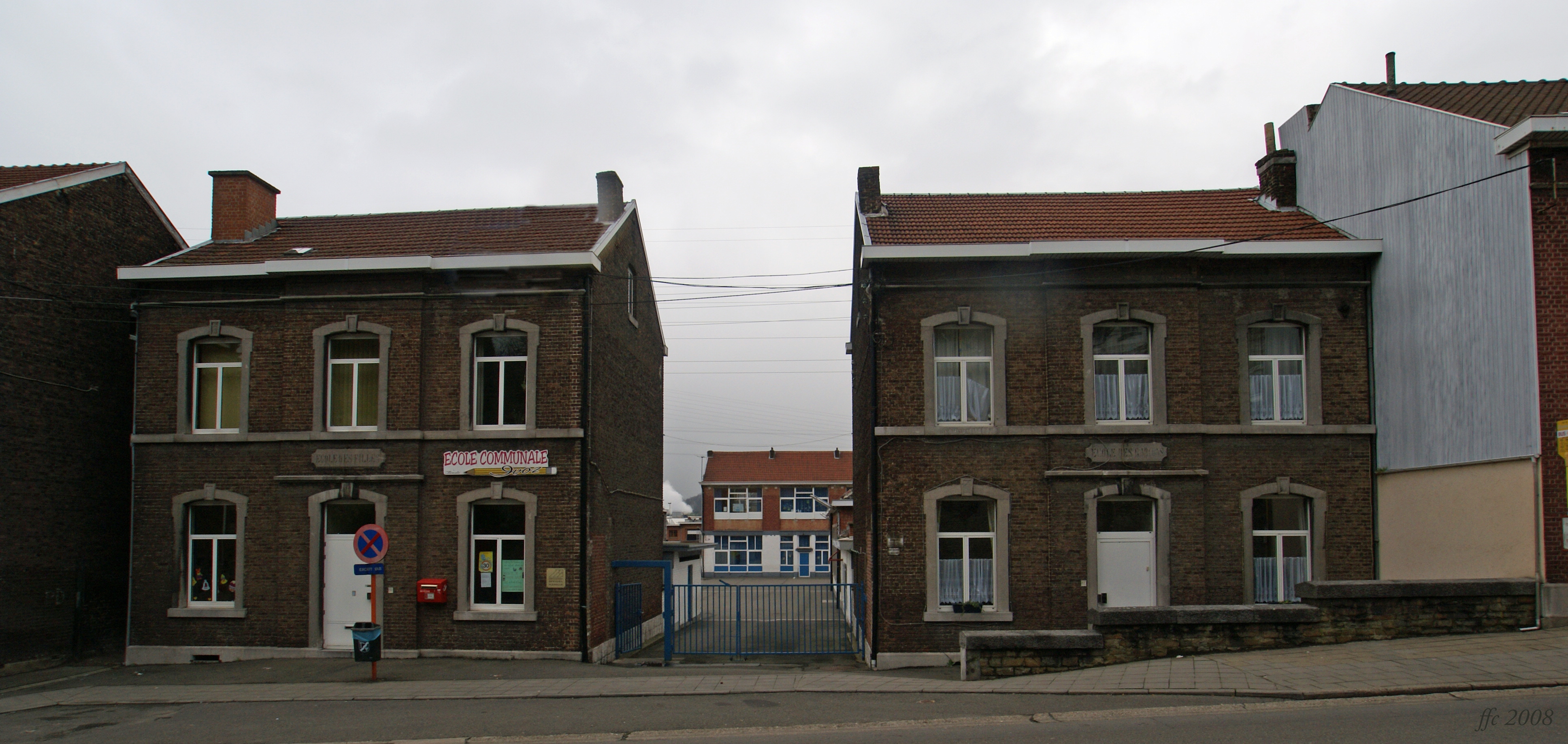
Municipal School of Ivoz, in the old school buildings with a school for boys and a school for girls.

The municipality has 18 municipal early childhood and primary schools:

- Awirs school (middle and upper primary)
- Les Cahottes school (nursery and primary)
- Cité Beulers school (nursery)
- Fontaine school (nursery and primary)
- Gros-Chêne school (nursery and primary)
- Houlbouse school (Sportive Régis Genaux) (nursery and primary)
- Ivoz school (nursery and primary)
- Jean Beulers school (primary)
- Autonomous nursery school of Mons (nursery)
- Jean-Marie Léonard school (nursery and primary)
- Parc school (nursery and lower primary)
- Ramet school (nursery and primary)
- Ramioul school (nursery and primary)
- Reine-Marie Braeken school (nursery and primary)
- Sart d'Avette 1 school (nursery and lower primary)
- Sart d'Avette 4 school (nursery and lower primary)
- Vinck school (nursery)
- XV Bonniers school (nursery and lower primary)

The municipality has one secondary education institution (provincial) which is the only Provincial Athénée of Wallonia, the Athénée Provincial de Guy Lang.

The municipality also has a special education institution of the French Community of Belgium that provides education for types 1, 2, and 8 in nursery, types 1, 2, and 8 in primary, and type 2 in secondary. Type 1 corresponds to children with learning difficulties or specific problems, type 2 corresponds to children with intellectual disability or significant delays, and type 8 corresponds to primary children with learning disorders such as dyslexia, dyscalculia, and other disorders. This school is named L'Envol.

An academy, Académie Marcel Désiron, is located in Flémalle.

== Health ==
The municipality has a hospital site of the Bois de l'Abbaye Hospital Center, located in central Flémalle. The municipality also has a Mental health service (SSM) which is composed of speech therapists, psychologists, social workers, and physical therapists.

== Sports ==
Flémalle has been one of the major towns in Belgian handball. This team sport was introduced in 1921 in the Liège Province and the Royal Olympic Club Flémalle was one of its main representatives with 11 Belgian Championships and 3 Belgian Cups. In addition to the men's section, it is worth noting that the women's section of the ROC Flémalle also competed for a few seasons among the Belgian elite, without standing out.

In other sports, it is worth noting that in women's basketball, two Flémalle clubs managed to reach Division 1, Alliance Flémalle and ISC Flémalle, though they did not excel. The Flémalle Flames were a former American football team that merged with the Liège Red Roosters.

=== Martial Arts ===
6 martial arts clubs are located in Flémalle: tai chi, ju-jitsu, judo, and karate. The Jiu-Jitsu Club Flémalle teaches ju-jitsu at the Jean Beulers municipal school.

The Karate Club Flémalle teaches karate and was founded in 1995. Thomas Doret is one of the club's instructors and holds the black belt as 1st Dan. It is located at the Trixhes sports hall (André Cools).

Karaté Mushin Mons-lez-Liège is run by Victor Tatarevic, who was a member of the Belgian national karate team from 1969 to 1973. He won two bronze medals at the European Team Championships in 1969 and 1972 in the under 68 kg category.

=== Athletics ===
The Flémalle Athletic Club (F.A.C.) is an important athletics club in the Liège region. It was founded on 10 October 1970. Before the creation of the club, the runners were part of the R.F.C. Liégeois and they ran on a cinder track, located near the André Cools sports hall, inaugurated in 1952 by Gaston Reiff, a great athlete who won the 5000 meters at the London Olympics in 1948. However, the club now has a tartan track which has been in use since the 2000s.

Belgian cross-country runners particularly appreciate the course of the site located on the Nature Reserve "Aux roches", including Karel Lismont, Willy Polleunis, Emiel Puttemans, Leon Schots and others.

The club organizes major championships: in 1985, the L.B.F.A. cross-country championship; in 1989, the Belgian cross-country championship for cadets and schoolboys; in 1990, the Belgian cross-country championships for Juniors/Seniors; in 1992, the L.B.F.A. cross-country championship; in 1996, the Belgian semi-marathon championship; in 1999, 2000, and 2002, the Belgian 10,000 meters championships; and in 2002, 2004, and 2006, the Belgian Cross Masters championship.

Paul Roekaerts is one of the club's coaches. Colin Glesner holds the Benjamins records for 1000 meters (2003), long jump (2003), and 1 kg shot put (2003), which have not been beaten by the club since. Among the Cadet Records, Philippe Goffin holds the club javelin record of 600 grams since 1979. He also holds the club javelin record of 700 grams for Schoolboys since 1980 and the javelin record of 800 grams for Juniors since 1983.

=== Boxing ===
In 2020, Madani Rahmani, world champion in kickboxing K1 in the light heavyweight division, opened his own boxing school, taking over from his former coach Fabian Pavone (sports alderman of Flémalle).

=== Football ===
Flémalle has three major football clubs: Royal Football Club de Flémalle, Royal Flémalle Sporting Club, and Rocourt. Additionally, several amateur clubs also exist.

=== Royal Football Club de Flémalle ===
Founded in 1920, the Royal Football Club de Flémalle (RFCF) joined the Belgian Football Association (URBSFA) in 1924. It currently plays in the 1st Provincial Division. RFCF won the Belgian provincial title in 1931 and 1971 and also won the provincial cup in 1932 and 1956. The club's colors are blue and white.

=== Royal Flémalle Sporting Club ===
Founded in 1952, the Royal Flémalle Sporting Club (RFC) currently plays in the 2nd Provincial Division. The club's colors are red and white.

=== Tennis ===
The Tennis Club de Flémalle (TCF) is a tennis club founded in 1924 and affiliated with the Belgian Tennis Federation. It is located at the André Cools sports hall and has 6 clay courts.

=== Climbing ===
The climbing school of Flémalle is located at the André Cools sports hall and offers various climbing courses for all levels.

=== Petanque ===
The Petanque Club de Flémalle (PCF) was founded in 1994. It is a member of the Royal Belgian Petanque Federation and has won several local and national titles.

=== Skatepark ===
The skatepark of Flémalle, located in the "Cité des Sports," is a recent addition to the town's sports facilities, offering various skateboarding and BMX activities.

=== Finance ===
The Flemish banks are located along the Grand'Route, the main economic artery of the municipality with all its small shops and large chains situated nearby. In the center, there are a Belfius bank, a BNP Paribas Fortis, a Falemo, a Fintro, an ING, a NagelMackers, and a Scazzi. However, Flemish banks are gradually disappearing with the advent of electronic payment and technological advances. The COVID-19 crisis has shown this with appointments only via telephone or video conferencing. Electronics are thus undoubtedly the future of banking.

=== Commerce ===
The municipality has about ten supermarkets specializing in food, such as a Delhaize, a Carrefour hypermarket, a Lidl, and a Spar.

The Carrefour Market, which is currently located on the Trixhes plateau in the new development along the national road, was previously in the center, a few steps from the hypermarket. The municipality wants to establish the Cultural center of Flémalle in the former Carrefour premises, which is poorly known to residents due to its poor location and design. The building is currently in a state of abandonment.

=== Socio-economics ===
==== Land Prices ====
The average price of building plots in Flémalle is 25 euros/m^{2}, ranking 520th out of 589 of the most expensive municipalities in Belgium. In comparison to neighboring municipalities: 39 euros for Engis, 43 for Seraing, 46 for Saint-Georges-sur-Meuse, 53 for Grâce-Hollogne, and 75 for Neupré.

==== Annual Income per Inhabitant ====
The average annual net income per inhabitant in euros for Flémalle was 12,316 euros in 2005 and 14,122 euros in 2009. It ranks 465th in 2009 among municipalities with the highest income. In comparison to neighboring municipalities: 12,780 euros for Seraing, 13,263 euros for Engis, 13,503 euros for Grâce-Hollogne, 14,616 euros for Saint-Georges-sur-Meuse, and 19,899 euros for Neupré. The latter is also the 19th Belgian municipality with the highest average annual net income per inhabitant in euros in 2019.

=== Tourism ===
Tourism in Flémalle is very diverse, ranging from the Prehistomuséum to open churches or the fort. Several organizations, committees, and enthusiasts help with tourism and the history of Flémalle. For example, the Les Amis Marcheurs d'Ivoz club introduces visitors to the village of Ivoz and the greenery of the municipality, which citizens find difficult to grasp, focusing only on the town center and its commercial parks.

As of 31 December 2018, Flémalle had about ten beds compared to an average of 281 beds in Walloon municipalities. Flémalle is one of the municipalities with the fewest beds in Wallonia. In comparison, La Roche-en-Ardenne has 3,465 beds, and the neighboring municipalities of Flémalle have: 0 for Saint-Georges-sur-Meuse, 28 for Engis, 15 for Neupré, 132 for Seraing, and 0 for Grâce-Hollogne. However, these figures should be taken with caution as a hotel is located in Grâce-Hollogne at the airport, and the figures provided by WalStat (the Walloon statistics agency) are inaccurate.

Regarding the number of accommodation establishments, Flémalle has two, while the Walloon average is 14 establishments. Durbuy has the most with 154, compared to 25 establishments in Liège. For Flémalle's neighboring municipalities, there are 0 establishments in Grâce-Hollogne, 7 in Engis, 2 in Neupré, 1 in Seraing, and 0 in Grâce-Hollogne. For Grâce-Hollogne, the figures are incorrect as a hotel is located at the airport.

The number of overnight stays is unknown. Wallonia recorded 8,727,266 overnight stays, including 484,034 for Vielsalm. For Flémalle's neighboring municipalities, the number of overnight stays is known for two municipalities: 2,824 in Engis and 0 in Saint-Georges-sur-Meuse.

The number of tourist visits to the municipality is unknown. According to the annual guide Tourism and Attractions, Flémalle has one tourist attraction. Of course, the municipality has other tourist attractions not listed in the guide.

==== Open Churches ====
Open churches is a tourist network in Belgium, Luxembourg, and the northeast of France that showcases the historical and architectural heritage of various churches. In the municipality, there are three: the Saint-Lambert Church of Gleixhe, the Saint-Nicolas Church of Souxhon, and the Saint-Matthias Church of Flémalle-Haute.

==== Chokier ====
The village of Chokier is a major tourist attraction in Flémalle. The village is unique, as is its church and castle. The latter partially burned in a fire, which triggered a wave of sadness among the Flémalle residents who see it daily, overlooking the Meuse from its rocky promontory.

In this village, one can find lime kilns and quarries. On top of the village, in the fields behind the castle, it is thought that a Roman villa is buried under the land.

==== Fort de Flémalle ====
The Fort de Flémalle is one of the main attractions of the municipality, located on a plain overlooking the municipality. It has become a museum open to the public on the first Saturday and third Sunday of each month. Recently, the museum has modernized and now offers a virtual reality tour of the fort.

==== Nature Reserves ====
Two nature reserves are located in the municipality: Aux Roches and Rognac.

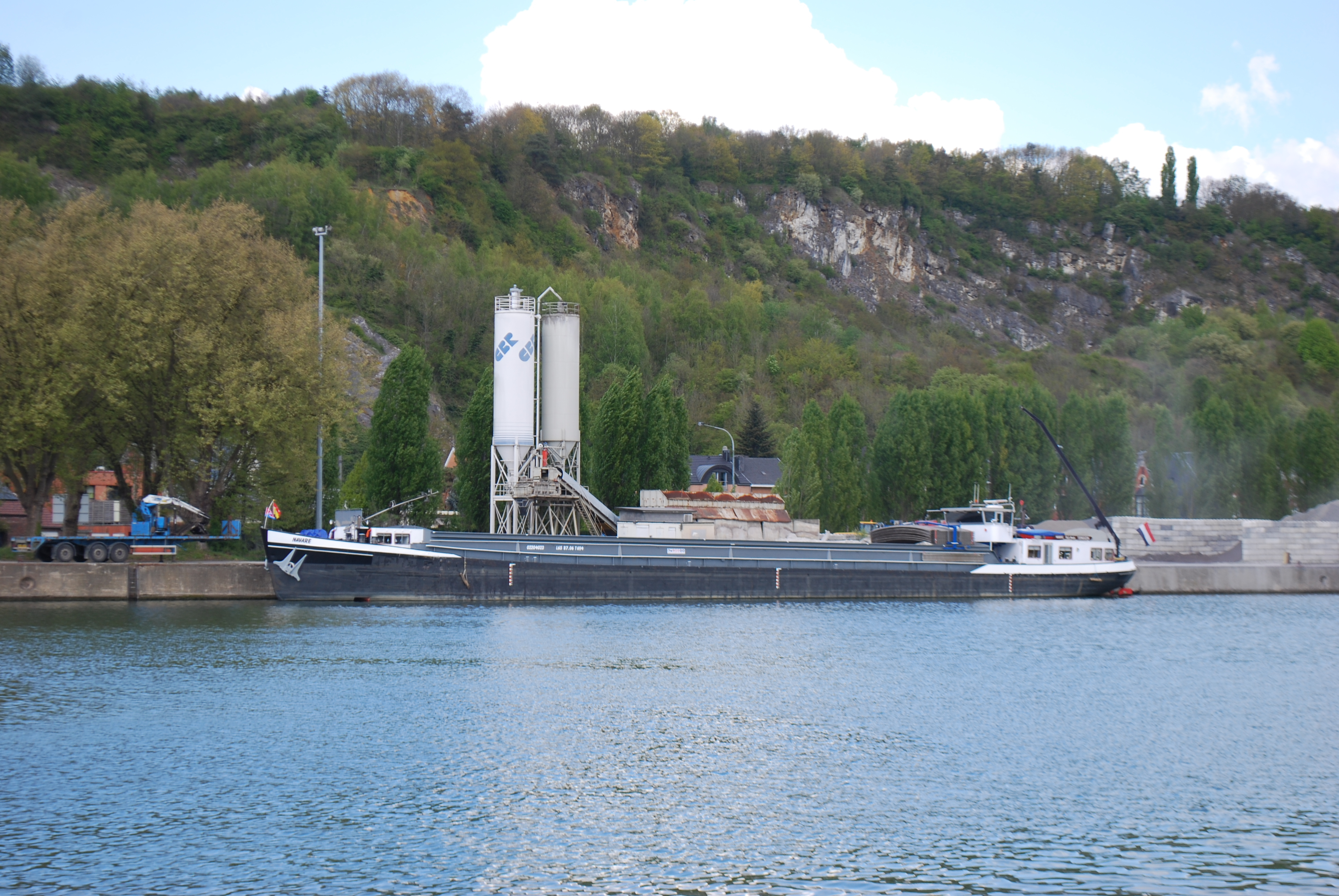
The Meuse Quays. In the background, the nature reserve "Aux Roches".

The first, created in 1996 by Natagora, covers an area of 27.13 ha and features a Mediterranean climate. The site's geology was formed through the extraction of limestone in the village of Chokier from Roman times until the 20th century, with three quarries, the most impressive of which was still operational in the 1950s; this is the one visible from the Meuse basin. Among the fauna and flora observed here are the Peregrine falcon, the Eurasian eagle-owl, the Apennine rock-rose, and the hairy fruit salad.

The second reserve, created in 1978, covers 12.1 ha. This reserve is a so-called strict reserve, meaning it is left as it is with no human intervention allowed. In terms of fauna and flora, one can observe the Eurasian goshawk, the Eurasian kingfisher, the Fire salamander, and the Epipactis helleborine.

==== Tailings Dumps ====
From its industrial and mining past, Flémalle is rich in tailings dumps that over time have become biotopes.

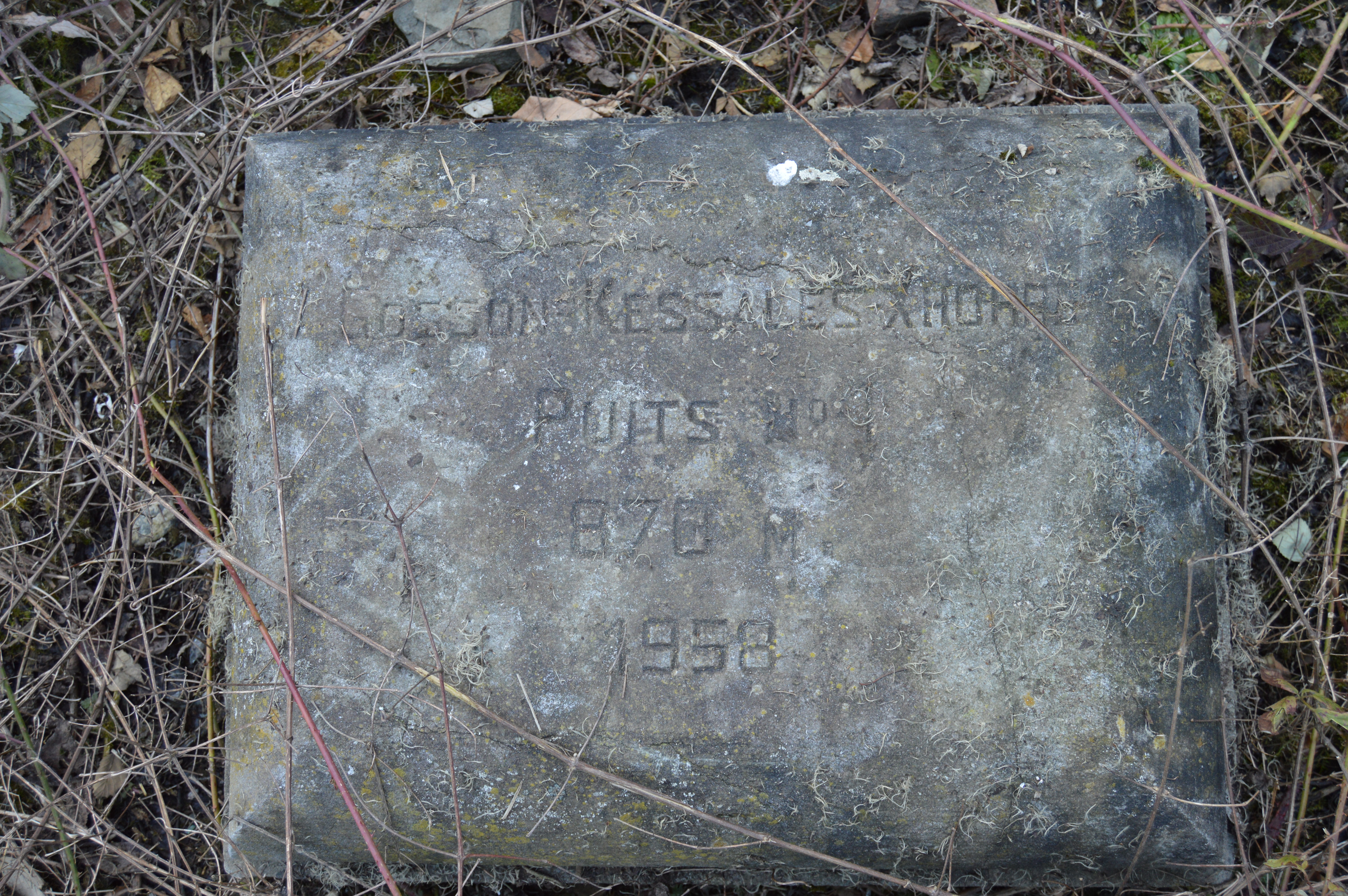
A stone located on one of the old shafts of the Xhorré coal mine.

The largest Flemish tailings dump is that of Xhorré, classified as a Site of Major Biological Interest (SGIB) by Wallonia. The dump is wooded but also features thermophilic meadows. Its area is 15.78 ha. In terms of fauna and flora, one can observe the Common slowworm, the Spotted fritillary, the European stag beetle, the Striped katydid, and the Medlar.

== Places of Worship ==
In 2021, Flémalle has Catholic parishes, an Apostolic chapel, a Protestant worship place, and a house of secularism.

=== Catholic Parishes ===
There are 14 parishes in Flémalle (including one chapel and two services in the nursing homes "Les Fougères" and "Le château de Ramioul"). These parishes are managed by three priests: in 2021, they are Dean Jacques Boever, Father Daniel Jacques, and Father Fulbert Mujike.

- Church of Saint Etienne des Awirs

This church is part of the pastoral unit of Aigremont-Saint-Mathias and is part of the Diocese of Liège. The church is surrounded by a cemetery, includes a Romanesque tower dating from the 16th century (for its enhancement), and the current church dates from the 19th century. The tower of the church is the last remnant of the former Abbey of Awirs, which moved not far from Brussels.

The first baptism on record dates back to 29 June 1637. The oldest burial dates back to September 1659 and the first child burial, to 6 January 1770. The first recorded marriage dates back to 23 February 1656.

- Church of Saint Matthias of Flémalle-Haute

The church is part of the open churches. The building, made of bricks and stones, dates from 1717 while its tower dates from 1830. The transept and the new choir date from 1908. Also notable is a wooden calvary. Notable decorative items inside include a high altar in wood of Louis XIII style and 18th-century wooden statues from the school of Jean Del Cour. The organ case itself dates from 1598 and is among the oldest in the province. A heraldic funerary monument is located in the church and belongs to Halin de Lambert, a benefactor of the church.

It belongs to the pastoral unit of Aigremont-Saint-Matthias and the Diocese of Liège. It is the main church of this pastoral unit, which includes seven churches. A cemetery is located next to the church.

The first civil act dates from 9 February 1798, the first baptism from 23 November 1762, the first death record from 27 November 1762, and the first marriage record from 26 January 1763.

- Church of Saint Remacle des Cahottes

The church belongs to the pastoral unit of Aigremont-Saint-Matthias and the Diocese of Liège.

- Église Saint Lambert de Gleixhe

The church belongs to the pastoral unit of Aigremont-Saint-Matthias and the Diocese of Liège.

It is part of the Open churches network. It is a church of Baroque and Neoclassical architecture style dating from 1779. Unlike other churches, this one is not located in the center of a village but rather on the outskirts, at the entrance to a wood, surrounded by a cemetery and a few houses. The church was completed in 1783 and is a reconstruction of an earlier religious building destroyed during wars, notably by the passage of Louis XIV's troops. Its tower and sundial were renovated in 2006.

The interior of the church is in Louis XVI style. Noteworthy is the painting The Assumption of the Virgin, painted in 1783 by Jean-Joseph Hanson. The coat of arms of the Dukes of Arenberg are present in the church as it was rebuilt by them, who were then owners of the Hautepenne Castle. The Pulpit dates from 1665, and the Tombstone of Marie de Gavre from 1565. There is also a base of Baptismal font from the 12th century and a communion bench from the 17th century.

- Église Saint Marcellin de Chokier

The church dates from the end of the 13th century and was dedicated to Saint Peter and Saint Marcellin. Around 1715, the church was enlarged and took the shape it has today (except for the tower, which was built in 1838). The stained glass from the 18th century was blown out in 1944 by the explosion of a German V2 rocket. The church and its furnishings have been listed since 1987.

The church altar is old. The marble there was placed in 1865 by Abbot Frankinet. The altar retable consists of sculpted panels depicting Saint Marcellin and Saint Peter. A white and gold tabernacle dating from 1861 was also placed under Abbot Frankinet. A Bell from the former Abbey of Peace-God in Amay is located in the church.

The church does not have a transept. On the left side, there is a marble altar that serves as a mausoleum for the Berlo family, former occupants of the Chokier Castle. One of the best paintings by artist Englebert Fisen is located in the church. It represents the Vision of Saint Anthony. In 2000, a group of thieves stole a polychrome wooden statue of Saint Marcellin from the 16th century. It was recovered in 2001.

A walled cemetery dating from 1714 and a landscaped garden from 1999 are located around the church.

The church belongs to the pastoral unit of Aigremont-Saint-Matthias and the Diocese of Liège.

- Chapel Notre-Dame de Bon Secours des Trixhes

The chapel belongs to the pastoral unit of Aigremont-Saint-Matthias and the Diocese of Liège.

- Église Saint Nicolas de Souxhon

The church dates from 1745 and is surrounded by two cemeteries. Two candlesticks located in the church's choir are made of solid silver, dating from 1868 for the left one and 1869 for the right one. They come from a castle chapel in Flanders that was destroyed during World War II. Also in the choir is a Processional cross placed on a brass cross of glory dating from the 17th century.

The communion bench in wrought iron dates from 1786. It was brought from Limburg and renovated by the art workshops of the Abbey of Maredsous. Carved panels represent the Old Testament. The pews date from 1746.

The church bells were removed (except one) by the Germans during World War II. In 1951, it was decided to add new ones. In 1955, the bell that was not removed by the Germans was melted down to make six new bells that compose the new carillon. Thus, it is the only church in the municipality to have a carillon.

The current stained glass windows were installed by Monsignor Zuylen in 1955.

The church belongs to the pastoral unit of Aigremont-Saint-Matthias and the Diocese of Liège.

- Église Saint-Jean-Baptiste de Flémalle

The church belongs to the pastoral unit of Saint Roch and the Diocese of Liège.

The church was built between 1878 and 1882 and was consecrated on 23 May 1882. It was initially dedicated to Saint Mary before being dedicated to Saint John the Baptist. This church has been in a dilapidated state for several years following the decommissioning of the site.

Between 6 and 21 July 2015, several thefts were committed within the church. Two residents of Flémalle stole the pipes of the organ dating from 1596, which was said to be "priceless", and sold them online for a small amount of money.

- Church of Saint Lambert of Mons-lez-Liège

The church belongs to the Saint Roch pastoral unit and the Diocese of Liège.

The first mention of a place of worship at this site is a single-nave chapel that was expanded with a second nave. In the 11th century, a tower was added, and in the 12th century, a circular choir was added, though no reliable sources confirm this.

In 1568, it was destroyed and then rebuilt in 1587, but it was destroyed again in 1637 before being rebuilt in 1672. It was again destroyed in 1704 and rebuilt in 1750.

The church tower, in Romanesque style, dates from the 13th century or 14th century, but no reliable sources confirm this. The rest of the church, in Neo-Romanesque style, dates from 1952, rebuilt after the destruction of the church due to the subsidence of the mining ground beneath it.

- Church of the Virgin of the Poor of Profondval

It belongs to the Saint Roch pastoral unit and the Diocese of Liège.

This church is modern compared to other Flémalle churches. It was built around 1959 by L. Bertrand and dedicated to the Virgin of the Poor. It was constructed of stone and cement.

- Church of Saint Joseph of Ivoz

It belongs to the Engis pastoral unit and the Diocese of Liège.

The free fundamental school of Saint Joseph is associated with it.

- Church of Saint Peter and Paul of Ramet

The church belongs to the Engis pastoral unit and the Diocese of Liège.

It was built in the 18th century with brick and rough-cast limestone. An enclosed and disused cemetery adjoins the church.

The churches of Flémalle

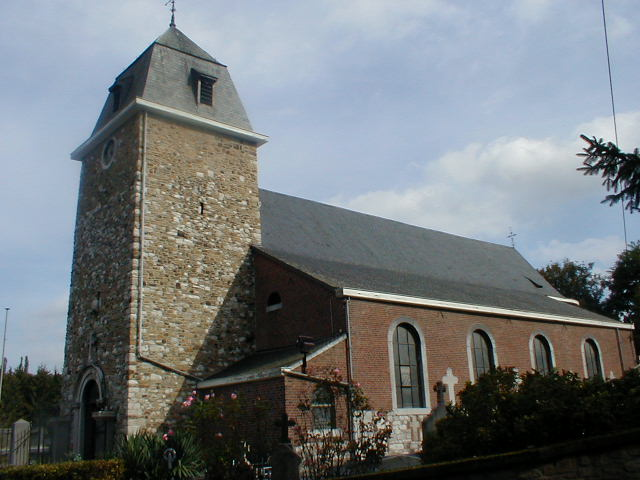
The church of Les Awirs with its recognizable tower.

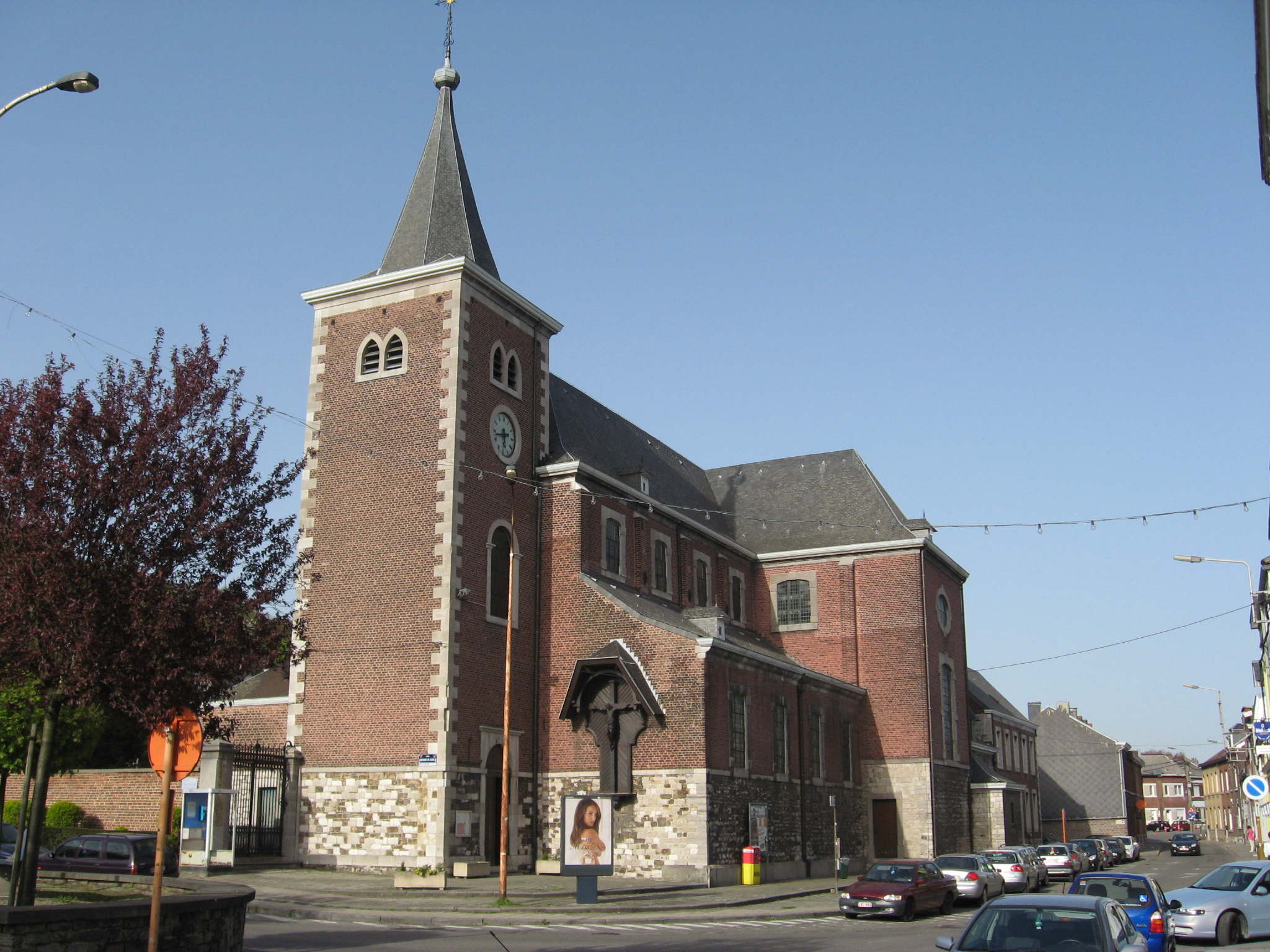
The Saint Matthias Church of Flémalle-Haute.

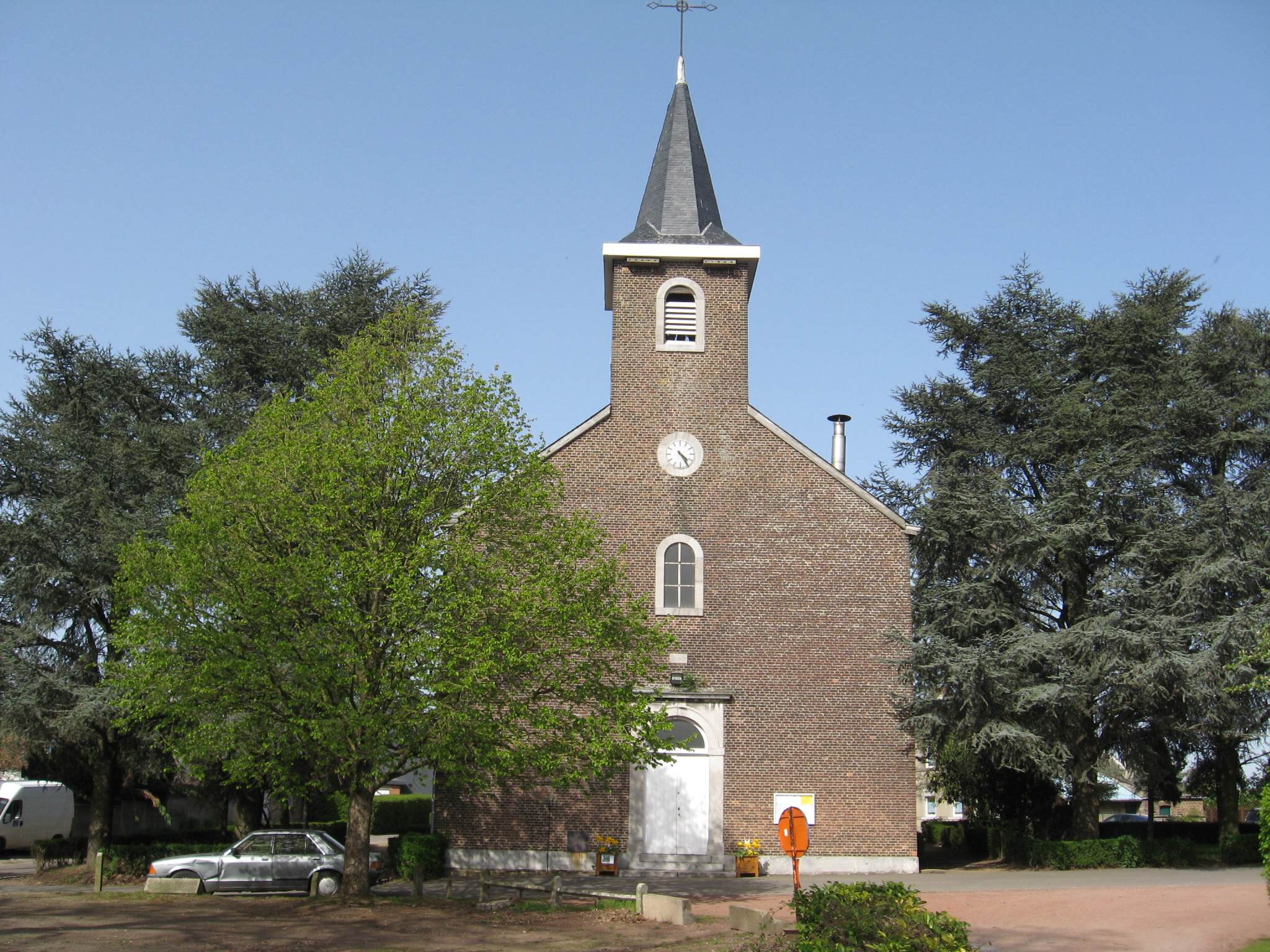
Saint Remacle Church of Cahottes, recognizable by its facade.

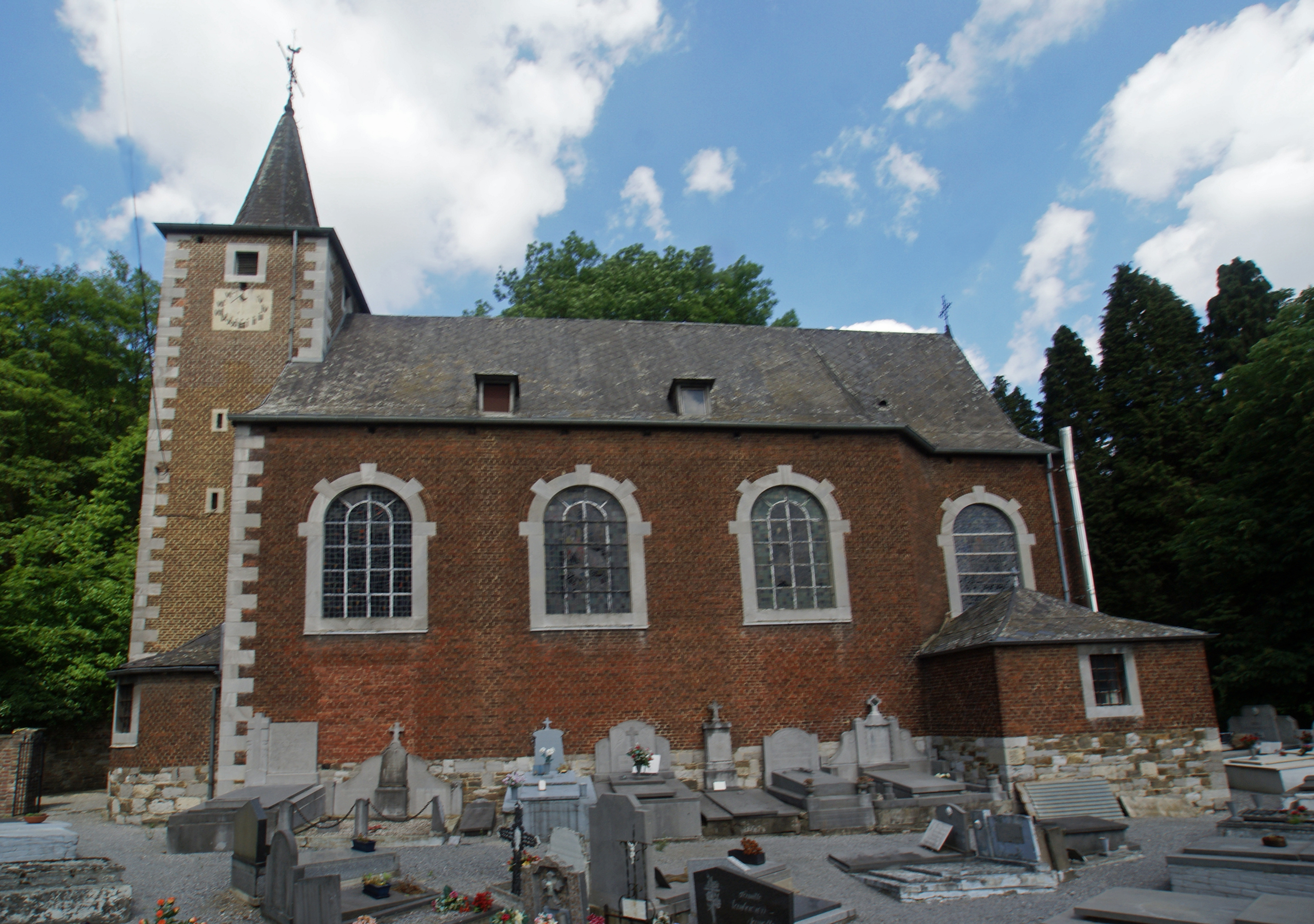
Saint Lambert Church of Gleixhe.

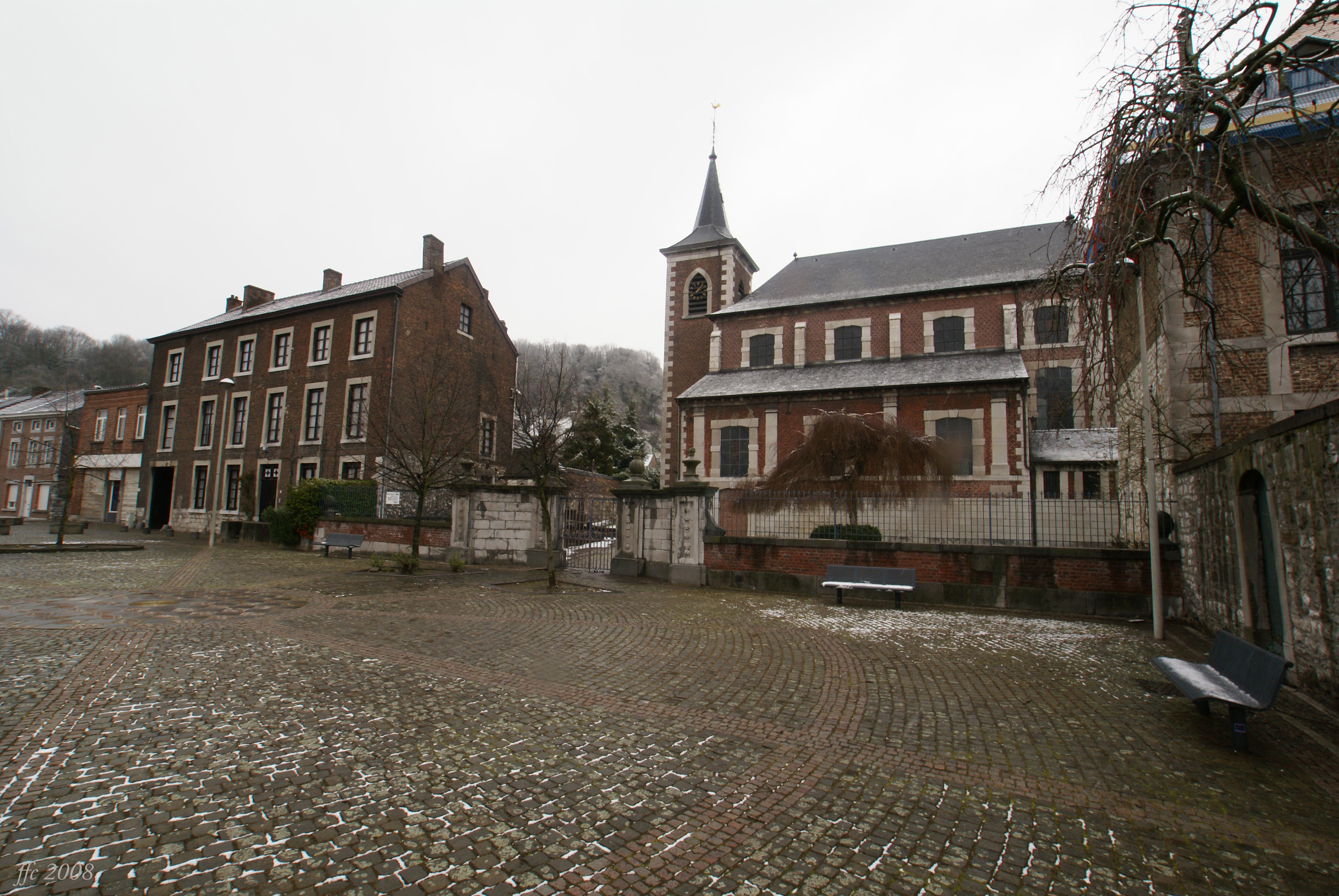
Saint Marcellin Church of Chokier.

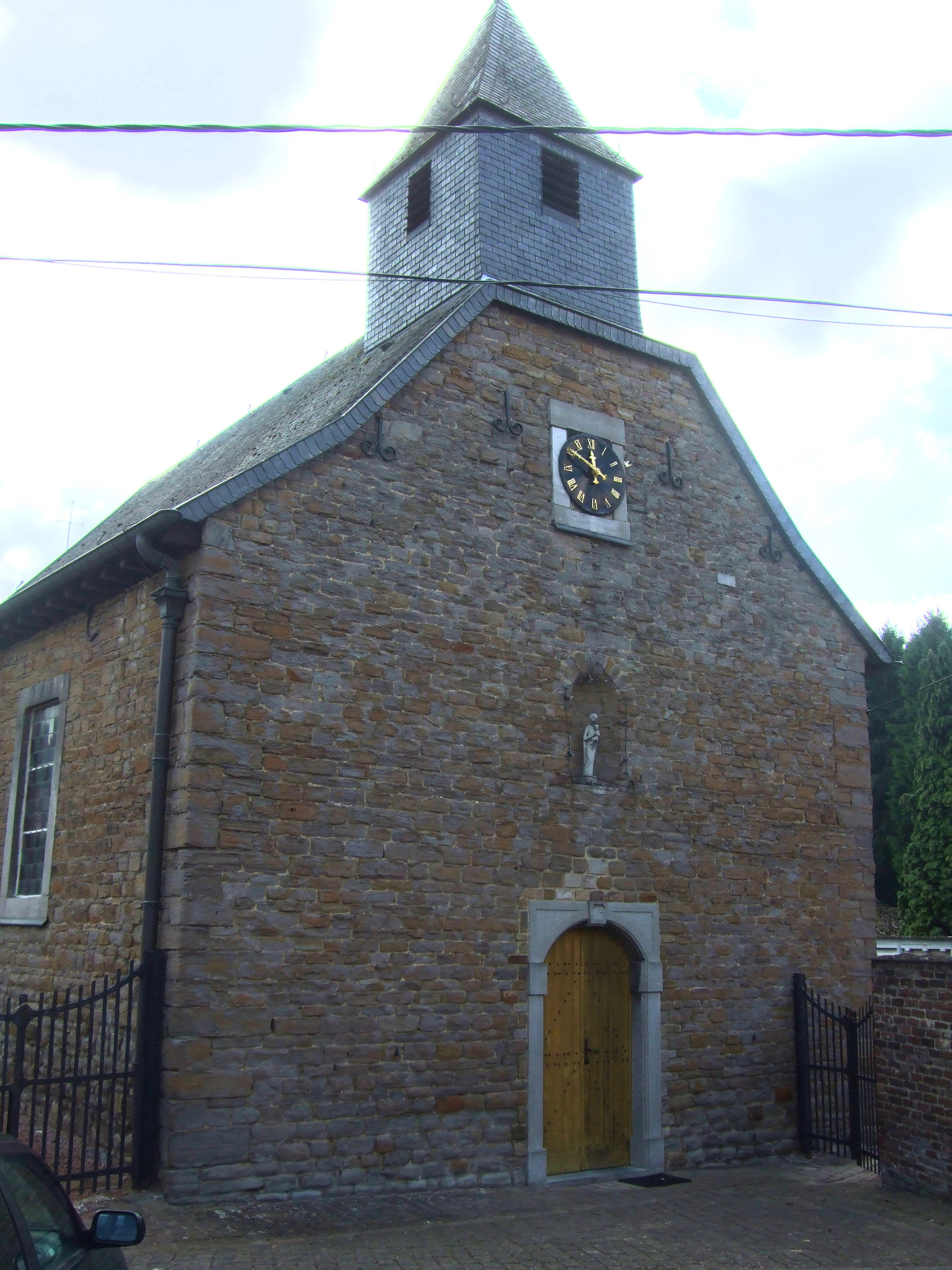
Saint Nicolas Church of Souxhon.

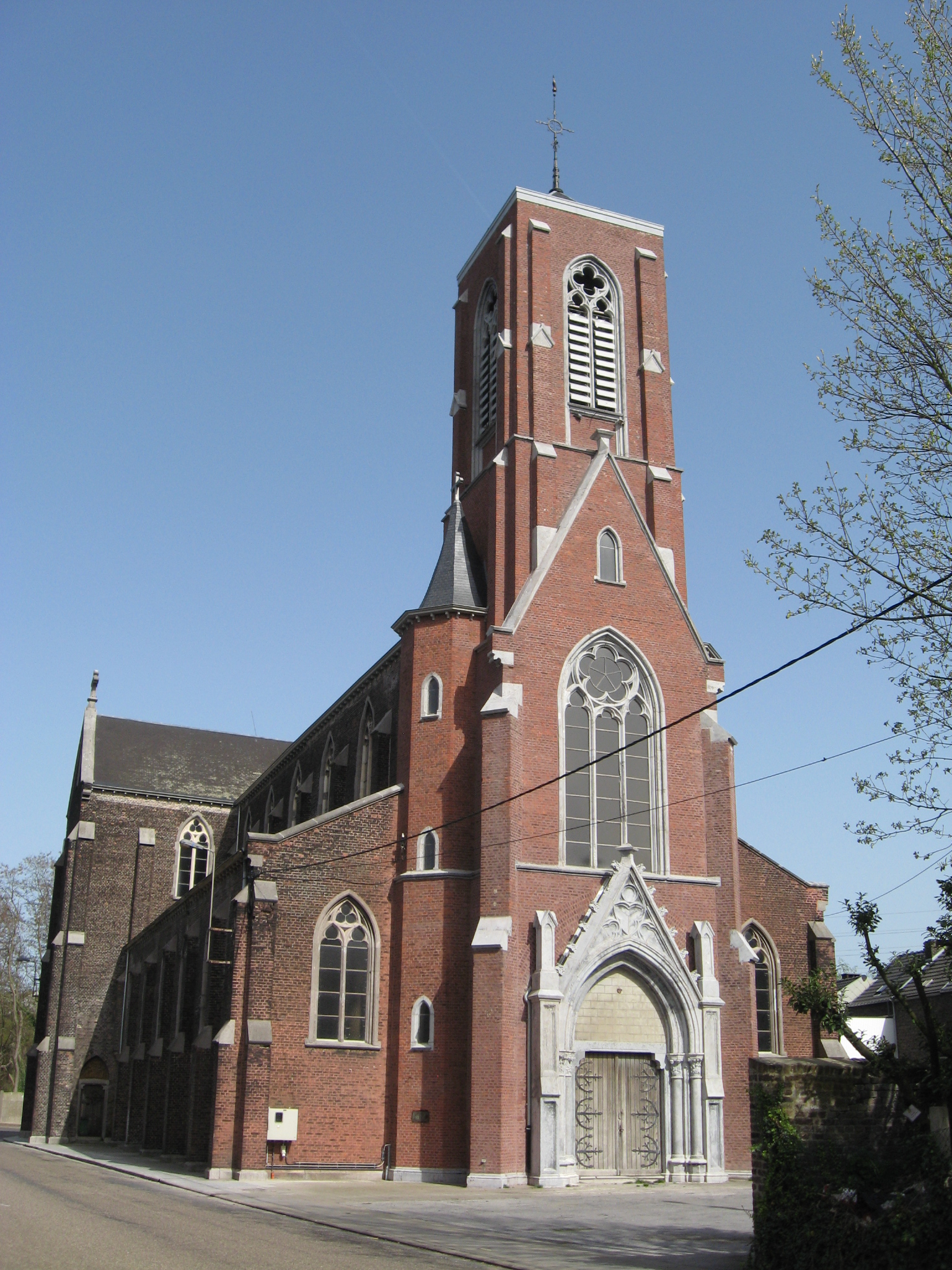
Saint John the Baptist Church of Flémalle, abandoned.

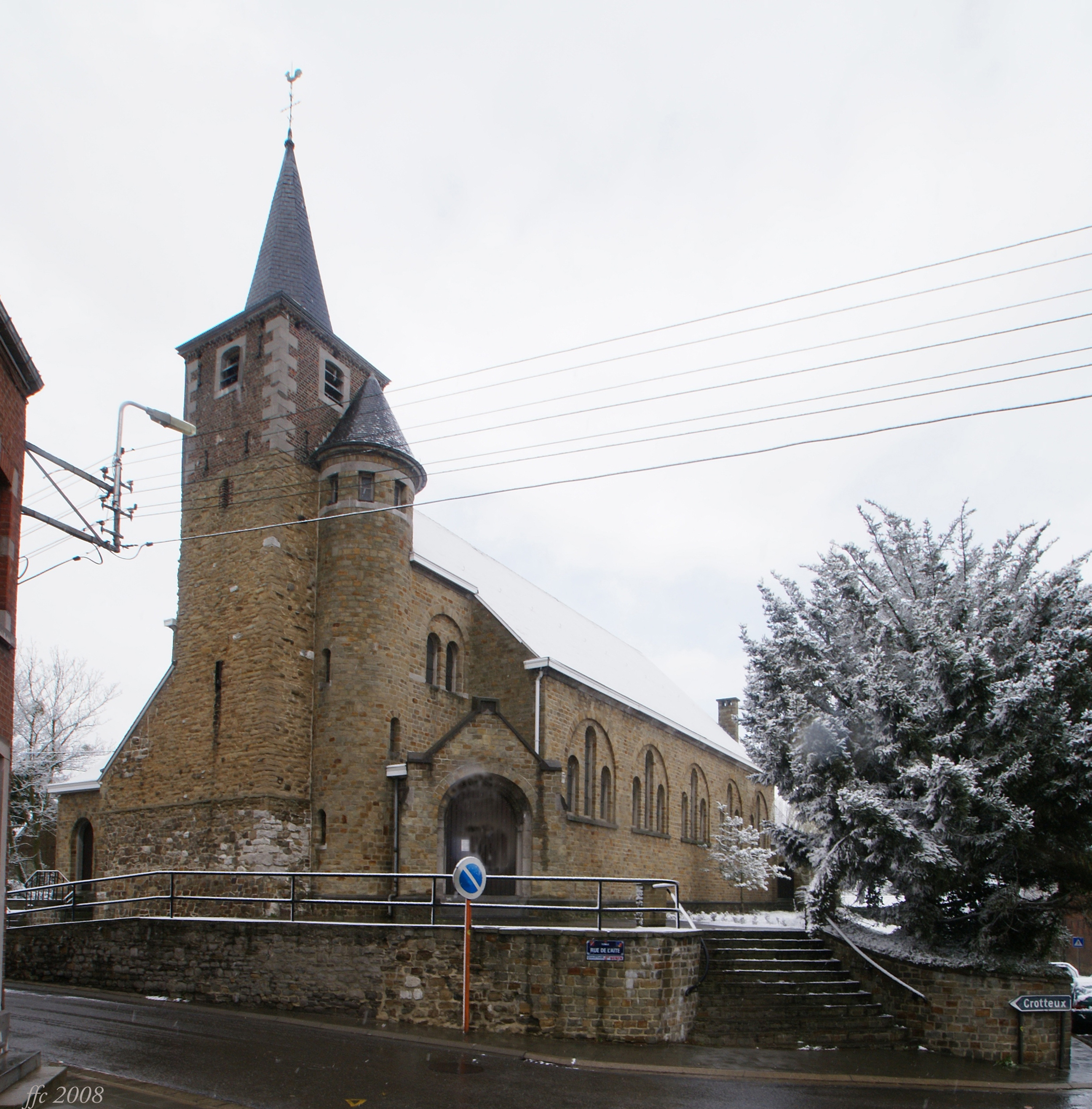
The church of Mons-lez-Liège.

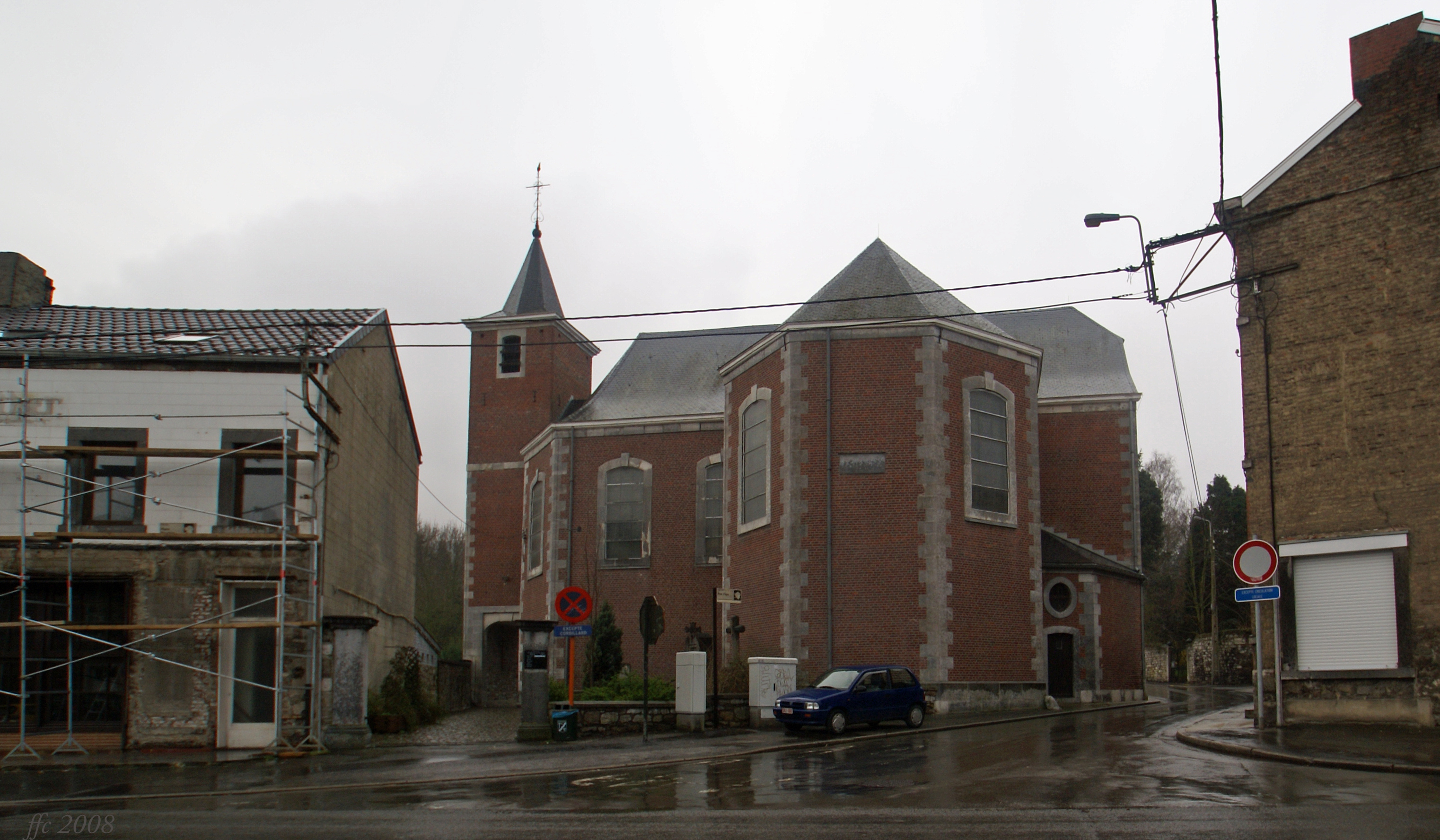
Saint Peter and Paul Church of Ramet.

=== Chapels ===
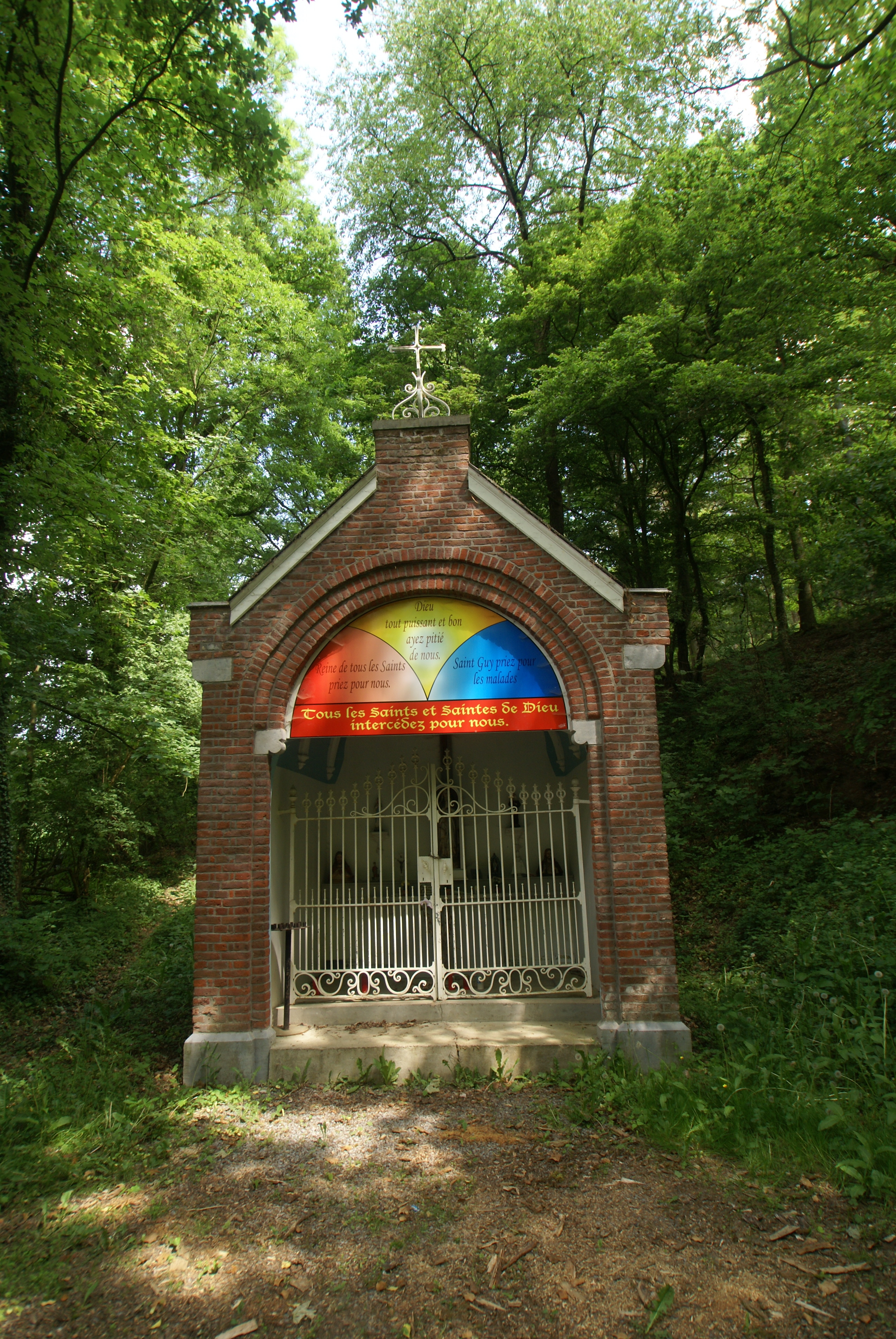
The Bouxhet Chapel, also known as Tous les Saints, in Gleixhe.

The municipality has numerous chapels, crucifixes, grottoes, and wayside crosses on its territory, approximately fifty in total.

List of Chapels in Flémalle
Name	Location	Description
Chapel of Saint Michael's Tree	Mons-lez-Liège, rue de l'Arbre Saint-Michel	Built between 1950 and 1961. It features a bell tower. In 2020, it was burned and devastated.
Chapel of the Beguines or Saint Leonard	Awirs, rue des BéGuinness	Built in 1907.
Chapel of "Bon Secours"	Trixhes, place de la Liberté	Built in its current state in 1903. It is very impressive due to its size and is often considered a church.
Chapel of Bouxhet or Our Lady of Lourdes or Saint Guy or Tous les Saints	Gleixhe	Built in 1867 and 1868. There were so many saints in this chapel that it was named Tous les Saints.
Chapel of the Calvary	Awirs, rue Val d'Awirs	Built in 1853.
Chapel of Chataigneraie	Ivoz-Ramet	Located in the Chataigneraie estate. Its roof style is unique.
Chapel of Aigremont Castle Aigremont, Aigremont Castle	Built from 1724 to 1725. It is large and adjoins Aigremont Castle. It is of Baroque style.	
Chapel of Christ or Crucifix	Awirs, Chaussée J. Wauters	Built in its current state in the early 19th century. Mentioned in 1744 as the place where official notices were posted.
Chapel of the Crucifix	Ramioul	Built in 1864 and damaged in 1970. It was rebuilt further away to allow for road widening. It is now of modern style.
Funeral Chapel of the Hemricourt Family	Ivoz-Ramet, behind the church of Ramet	Built between 1835 and 1840 and houses members of the Hemricourt family.
Chapel of Houlbouse	Chokier, rue Houlbouse	Brick chapel.
Chapel of Nuns or Bois des Moines	Awirs, rue Bois des Moines	Built in 1905 as a small church with a bell tower, nave, and transept to commemorate the 75th anniversary of the independence of Belgium.
Chapel of Our Lady of Seven Sorrows	Awirs, rue de la Reine	It reflects the pain felt by Mary following her son through his passion. Erected in 1885. It lists 23 saints.
Chapel of Our Lady of the Poor	Ramioul, rue de la Grotte	Built in 1959 in a modern style. It is now abandoned and dilapidated. It can be mistaken for a church and resembles the chapel of the Virgin of the Poor of Profondval.
Chapel Our Lady of Lourdes	Mons-lez-Liège, rue Jean Barthélemy	Built around 1907 to replace an old chapel destroyed during the construction of the local railway.
Chapel of Our Lady of the River	Chokier, Quai du Halage	Built in 1864.
Chapel of Our Lady of Good Help	Awirs, rue Tèwée	Destroyed. It listed 14 saints.
Chapel at the Foot of the Thier	Flémalle-Haute, rue Thier des Trixhes	Built after 1854.
Chapel of Saint Anthony of Padua	Mons-lez-Liège, rue Harkay	No longer exists.
Chapel Saint Bartholomew or Our Lady of Lourdes	Mons-lez-Liège, rue Jean Barthélemy	Still exists but is in a dilapidated state.
Chapel Saint George	Awirs, rue Hénâ	Built in 1914.
Chapel Saint Nicholas or Crucifix	Chokier	Built in the 18th century.
Chapel Saint Roch	Flémalle-Grande, rue de Flémalle-Grande	Built in 1913 and destroyed during construction work.
Chapel of Saint Roch	Mons-lez-Liège, rue Harkay	
Chapel Saint Vincent de Paul	Awirs	Also known as the Apostolic Chapel of Saint Vincent de Paul.
Chapel of the Virgin of the Poor	Profondval, rue de la Fontaine	Due to its size, it is considered a church. Built in 1959 in a modern style, with brick and cement.
Chapel of E'Tiyou Street	Mons-lez-Liège, rue E'Tiyou	No longer exists.
Chapel of Louis Mestrez Street	Gleixhe, rue Louis Mestrez	Stone chapel.
Chapel of Pyrie Street	Cahottes, rue Pyrie	It is desacralized.

=== Cemeteries ===
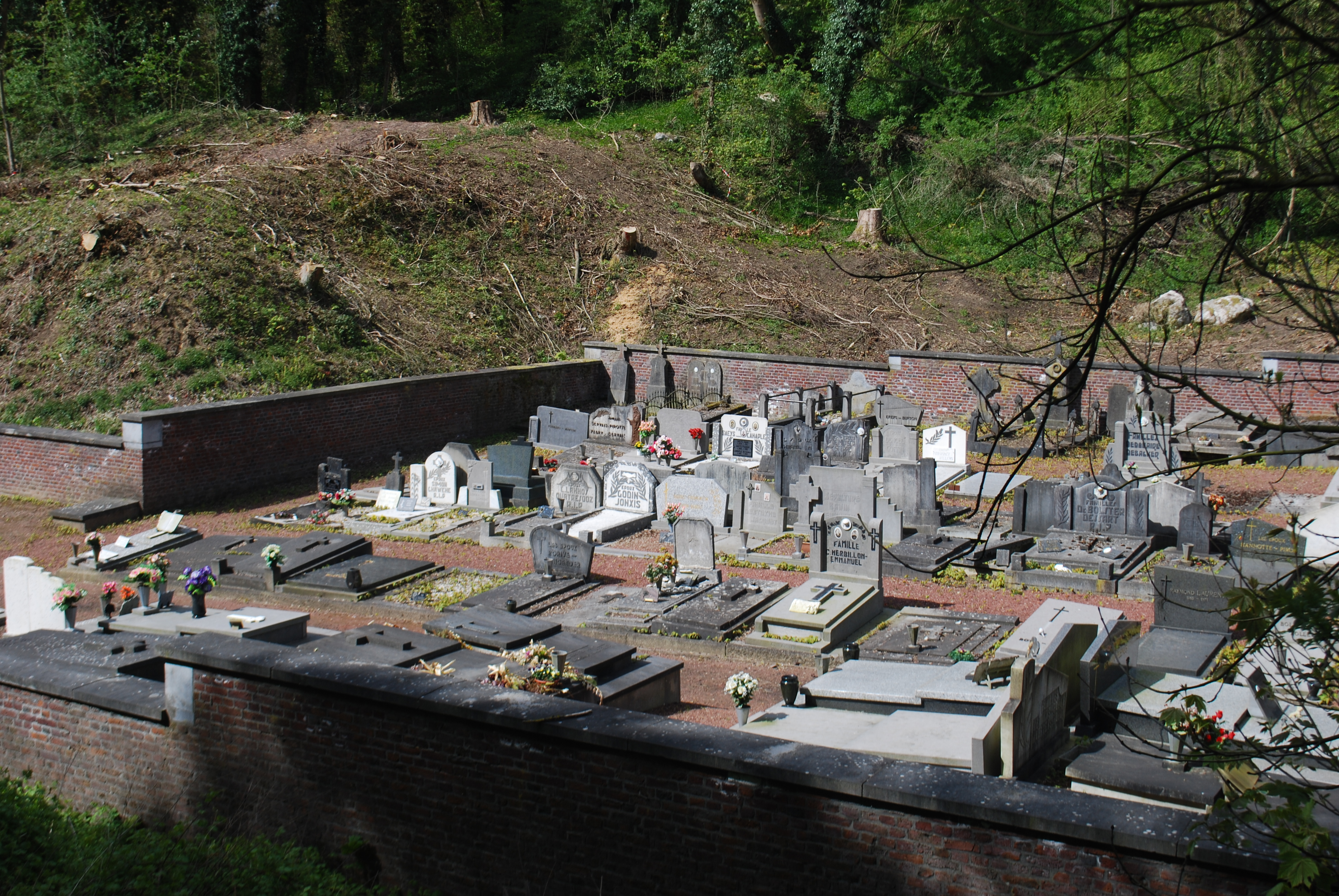
The Fontaine Cemetery located near Trixhes, in Flémalle-Haute.

The municipality has 14 cemeteries: the "La Fontaine" cemetery, the Tapeines cemetery, the old Ivoz-Ramet cemetery, the Ivoz-Ramet cemetery, the Awirs Church cemetery, the Awirs cemetery, the Mons-lez-Liège 1 cemetery, the Mons-lez-Liège 2 cemetery, the Mons-lez-Liège 3 cemetery, the Flémalle-Haute Church cemetery, the Flémalle-Grande cemetery, the Chokier cemetery, the Cahottes cemetery, and the Gleixhe cemetery.

- Tapeines Cemetery

The cemetery includes a scattering area for ashes. (Note: Regulations on cemeteries, burials, and funeral transports – Flémalle) It contains a war memorial. Marcel Cools and his wife are buried there; Marcel being the father of André Cools, former mayor of Flémalle. He died in 1942 at Mauthausen on 15 August 1942.

- Ivoz-Ramet Cemetery

The cemetery includes a scattering area for ashes and a columbarium. It features a monument to the heroes in memory of the centenary festivities in 1930 for victims of 1830 during the revolution. A commemorative plaque from World War II honors civilian victims and lists 29 names. Another war memorial honors victims of both World Wars. Another commemorative plaque honors the dead of World War II (10 names listed) and a plaque honoring soldiers who died during World War I (18 names listed, including two civilians). Another plaque lists the names of seven civilians who died during World War II.

- Awirs Church Cemetery

Often called the old Awirs cemetery compared to the more recent cemetery nearby, this cemetery dates back to the Middle Ages and is located around the Saint-Etienne Church of Awirs. For several centuries, burials were coemeterium, meaning entire generations of families were buried in the same grave.

The cemetery was owned by the church until the 19th century, and it decided who could be buried within the walls. Excommunicated, suicides, duel victims, and those without baptism were buried in li fâ ête, or the false cemetery, located in the priest's wood.

The oldest known graves are those of the de Durmarche (1595) and the Nihoule (1597). A tombstone with a piece of heraldry was found in this cemetery and is believed to belong to Marguerite de La Marck-Arenberg or Catherine de Oest d'Aigremont. However, the wealthier individuals could afford to be buried inside the church, such as Charles Boesmans, who died in 1633, priest Noël Pagnoul in 1690, and the lord of Waarge.

Following the Napoleonic decree of 12 June 1804, it is now forbidden to bury anyone within the walls of a church, but it is now possible to purchase a concession and erect a monument in the cemetery if one can afford it. However, this decree transfers the cemetery's oversight from the church to the municipality, which assumes all responsibilities.

In the 19th century, during a period of demographic boom, the cemetery increasingly ran out of space, not to mention the numerous graves with perpetual concessions. The church urgently needed to purchase new plots to expand the now too-small cemetery. Thus, in 1941, another extension of the cemetery was considered by architect Jean Meuris, but this project never materialized. However, in 1952, a new, larger cemetery was inaugurated a bit further away in the village.

Following the collapse of part of the old cemetery's walls on the night of 30 November 1998 to 1 December 1998, several village residents, with the support of the non-profit association Qualité-Village-Wallonie, mobilized to preserve what remained of the cemetery. In 2016, an "insect hotel" was created in the cemetery. At the beginning of 2020, the cemetery was on its way to being certified.

Thanks to the cemetery's redevelopment project, the village was awarded the Qualité-Village-Wallonie Trophy in 2007. The cemetery is open and tours are organized during heritage days.

- Mons-lez-Liège Cemetery 3

Mons-lez-Liège Cemetery 3 is located in Mons-lez-Liège. It should not be confused with the old Mons-lez-Liège Cemetery (Mons-lez-Liège Cemetery 1) located further along rue Jean Barthélemy and the Mons-lez-Liège Cemetery 2 (known as the Souxhon Cemetery) located in Souxhon.

Jean-Louis Adam is buried in this cemetery, a notable figure in the village of Mons-lez-Liège. One of the village's main streets is named after him. Several war memorials are located in the cemetery.

Here lie, among others, Julie Lejeune and Mélissa Russo, victims of Marc Dutroux. A memorial to them has been erected at the entrance of the cemetery. They were abducted on 24 June 1995 in Grâce-Hollogne. Numerous protests took place throughout Belgium and Europe, including the "White Marches", as well as a parliamentary commission, the reform of the police and gendarmerie, new institutions, and the Child Focus association.

- Flémalle-Haute Church Cemetery

A World War I war memorial and several individual graves are located here. Several plaques and names were added to the memorial to honor the dead of World War II.

== Heritage ==
=== Architectural Heritage ===
Flémalle has 15 listed heritage monuments and sites, including Aigremont Castle and the Schmerling Caves. Of course, there are other important monuments in Flémalle that are not listed as heritage sites.

Aigremont Castle is a construction dating back to around 900 and appears in various epic poems such as the Song of the Four Sons of Aymon or the Song of Maugis d'Aigremont. The castle is named after one of the protagonists of these legends: Beuves d'Aigremont. Briefly, the castle belonged to the Church of Liège before being acquired in 1715 by canon Mathias Clercx. He turned the castle into a pleasure residence, which is why, today, there are few fortifications around the fortress. It was during this time that the castle acquired its current appearance, a style typical of Liège architecture, though there is some mix with Louis XIV style. The interior of the castle contrasts with the exterior, featuring fine woodwork and frescoes. To the east, there are French gardens.

Further east from Aigremont, on a rocky promontory, is Chokier Castle. The choice to build a structure at this location dates back to Ancient Rome where remains of a Roman villa have been discovered a few hundred meters from the top of the rock. The course of the Meuse River near the village of Chokier is relatively recent as it was only after the limestone quarries in the Aux Roches Nature Reserve were exploited by Saint Peter that the village began to form by pushing the Meuse shoreline towards Ivoz-Ramet. Therefore, before the shoreline advanced, an advanced post, the fortress of Mont Iohy, was located where the castle stands today. Indeed, it is thanks to the construction of the village of Chokier and thus a crossing of the Meuse on the left bank that the advanced post lost its effectiveness and became a pleasure castle in the 18th century.

After the War of Awans and Waroux, the castle gained fame in the Prince-Bishopric of Liège: Guillaume de Hozémont, in 1298, after the war, saw his castle razed; he settled in Rouveroy and sold Hozémont, which included Chokier, to his cousin Jean de Rulant, who was then the marshal of the Prince-Bishopric of Liège, the supreme commander of the armies of the Prince in wartime and supreme judge in peacetime. The Rulant family's passage to Surlet was through Jean's daughter, who married a certain Jean Surlet. In 1345, the castle was burned by the Hutois, Liégeois, and Dinant people. After the Surlets, the Chabot family held the castle. Filled with a rich history, including a stay by Peter the Great, the castle caught fire on 27 March 2017 due to the electric blanket of the chatelaine. The castle in its current form is neoclassical. The tower located to the west of the castle dates from the late Middle Ages. The interior, especially in the entrance hall, is in Empire style and for a good reason: a general of the Napoleonic Army lived in the castle for several years.

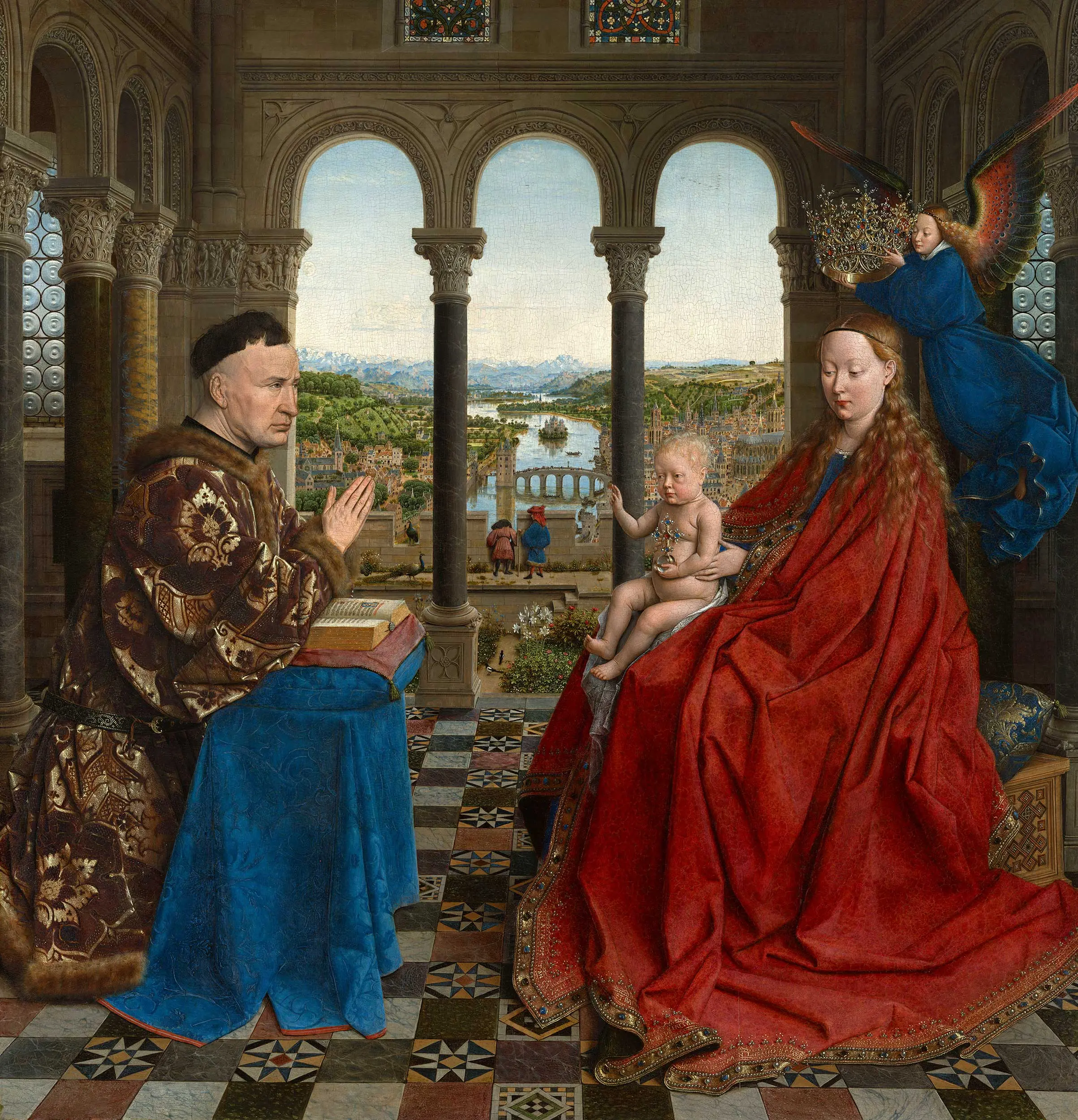
The fortress of Iohy is believed to be at the center of Jan van Eyck's painting The Virgin of Chancellor Rolin.

The castle is also thought to appear in several famous paintings; for instance, it might be depicted at the center of Jan van Eyck's painting The Virgin of Chancellor Rolin, in the third bend of the Meuse River, formerly the fortress of Mont Iohy. Also by Jan van Eyck, the fortress might appear in the illumination of The Birth of Saint John the Baptist in The Très Belles Heures of Notre-Dame, also at the center of the image. In 1567, Lucas van Valckenborch also depicted the fortress in a view of Liège. Less likely, but inspired by The Virgin of Chancellor Rolin, the castle might be associated with the following paintings: The Holy Anne Brotherhood by Quentin Metsys and The Virgin and Child with Saint John the Baptist by Bernaert van Orley.

In an English cottage style, the Château de la Croix Saint-Hubert was built in the 19th century on a green space by Emmanuel Hallet, a native of Binche. It was Charles Joseph Chaudoir who gave it its current appearance. This castle is privately owned but can be easily seen from walks around it.

Resembling a cadastral farmhouse, the Château de Hautepenne, or Haultepenne, is a castle located in Gleixhe, not far from Warfusée and Rouvroy, in a partially private wooded area. The oldest part of the castle is a keep dating back to 1330, probably built by Lambert de Harduemont. The rest of the building, constructed in an "L" shape, dates from the 17th century and 18th century. Its style is Liège Renaissance, although the most visible part is the wing built in the 18th century in a Louis XV style at the request of the Duke of Arenberg (the family owning the estate at that time). This castle notably served as a refuge for Guillaume de La Marck when he had to flee from Aigremont, which was being attacked by the troops of Prince Louis de Bourbon.

The Château de la Petite Flémal' is well-known in the municipality as it houses the municipal services. In 1614, Michel Valkener purchased a property to build his pleasure residence. The castle was expanded with a wing between 1710 and 1738, and then with a second wing after the castle was acquired by the municipality. In 2020, the interior of the castle was fully renovated. A garden, the municipal park, is located behind the castle.

The construction of the Château de Ramet is said to date back to the 13th century. This castle, accompanied by a "U"-shaped courtyard is built with a mix of sandstone, limestone, bricks, and cut stone. The castle is completely surrounded by moats still filled with water, with access to the courtyard via a small stone bridge. Remacle Le Loup created an engraving of the castle and its surroundings in 1738.

Finally, the Château de Ramioul, a large three-story castle with an average height of 12 meters, was built around 1840. It features an 18th-century gatehouse, with the rest mainly dating from the 19th century. The castle is in excellent condition due to the geriatrics activity it houses.

Castles in Flémalle

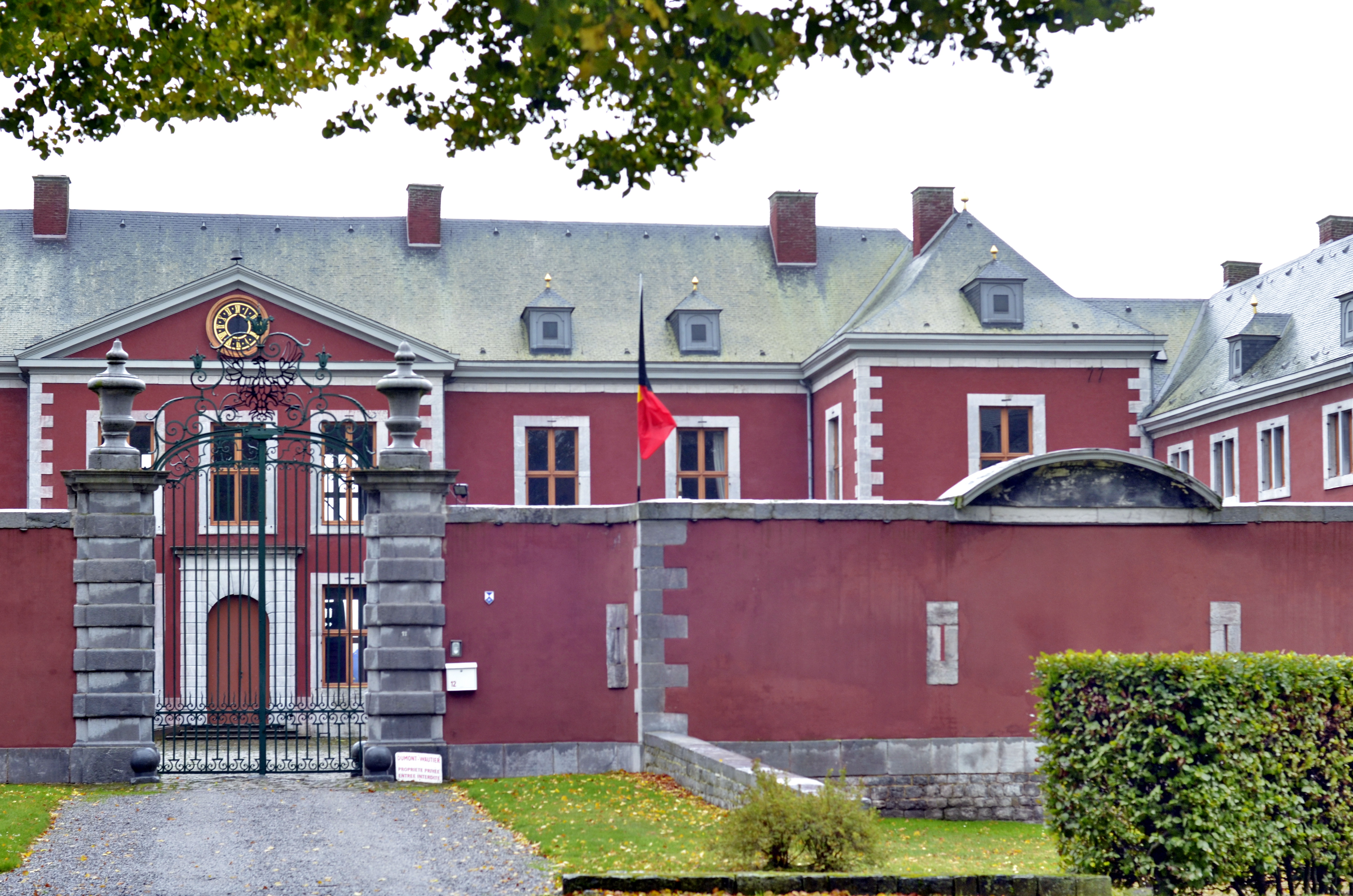
Château d'Aigremont.

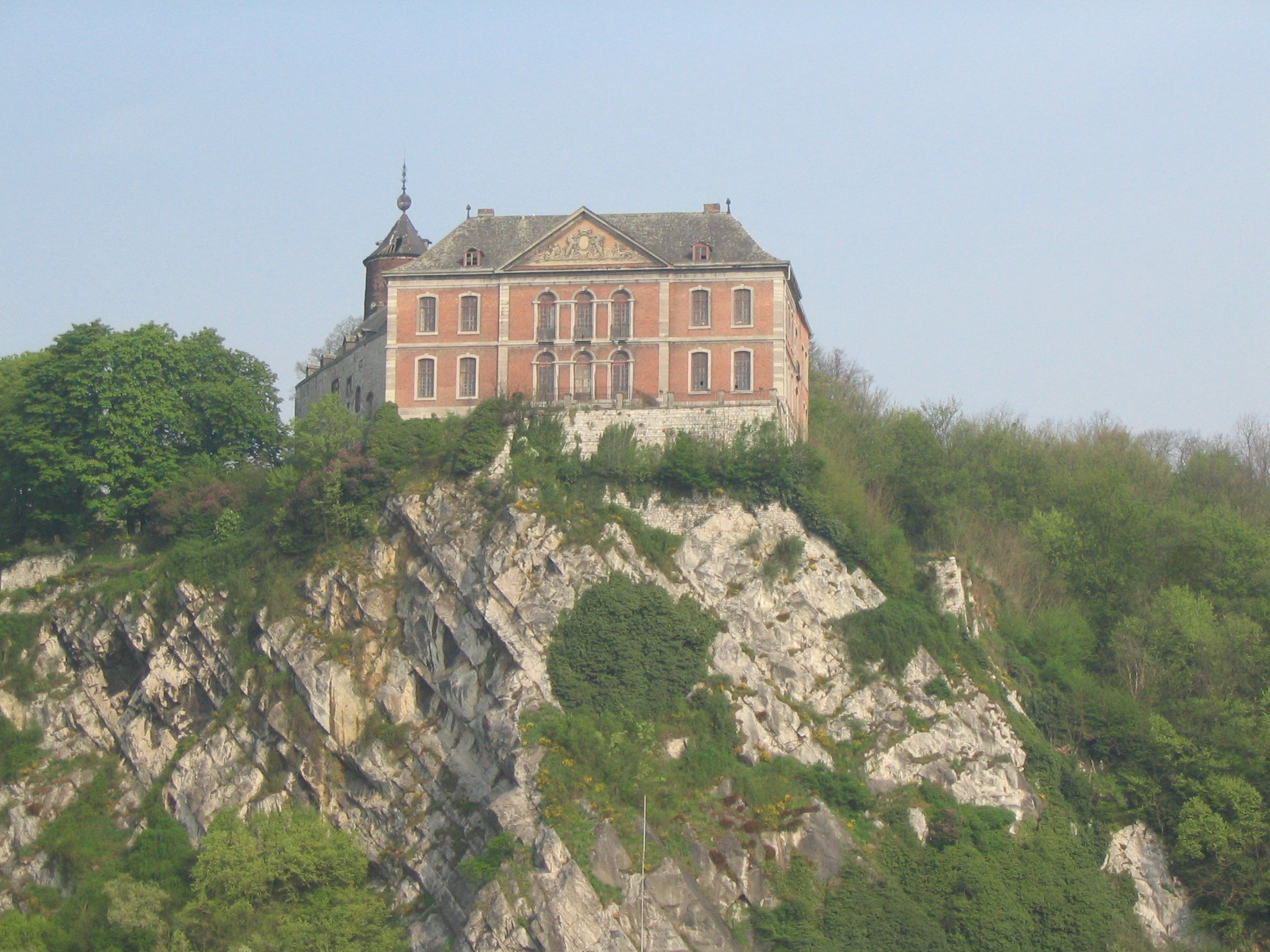
Château de Chokier, before the fire.

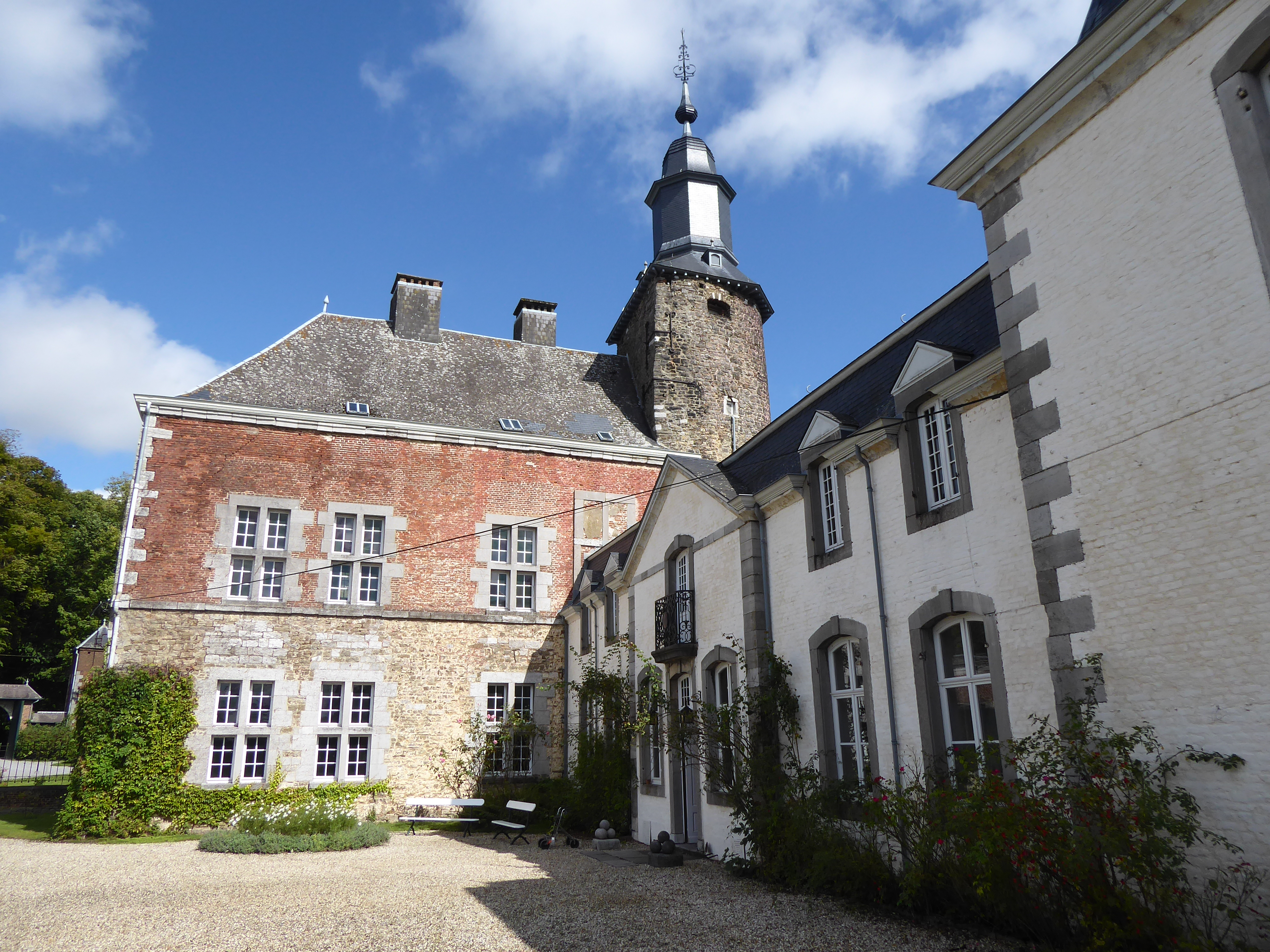
Château de Hautepenne.

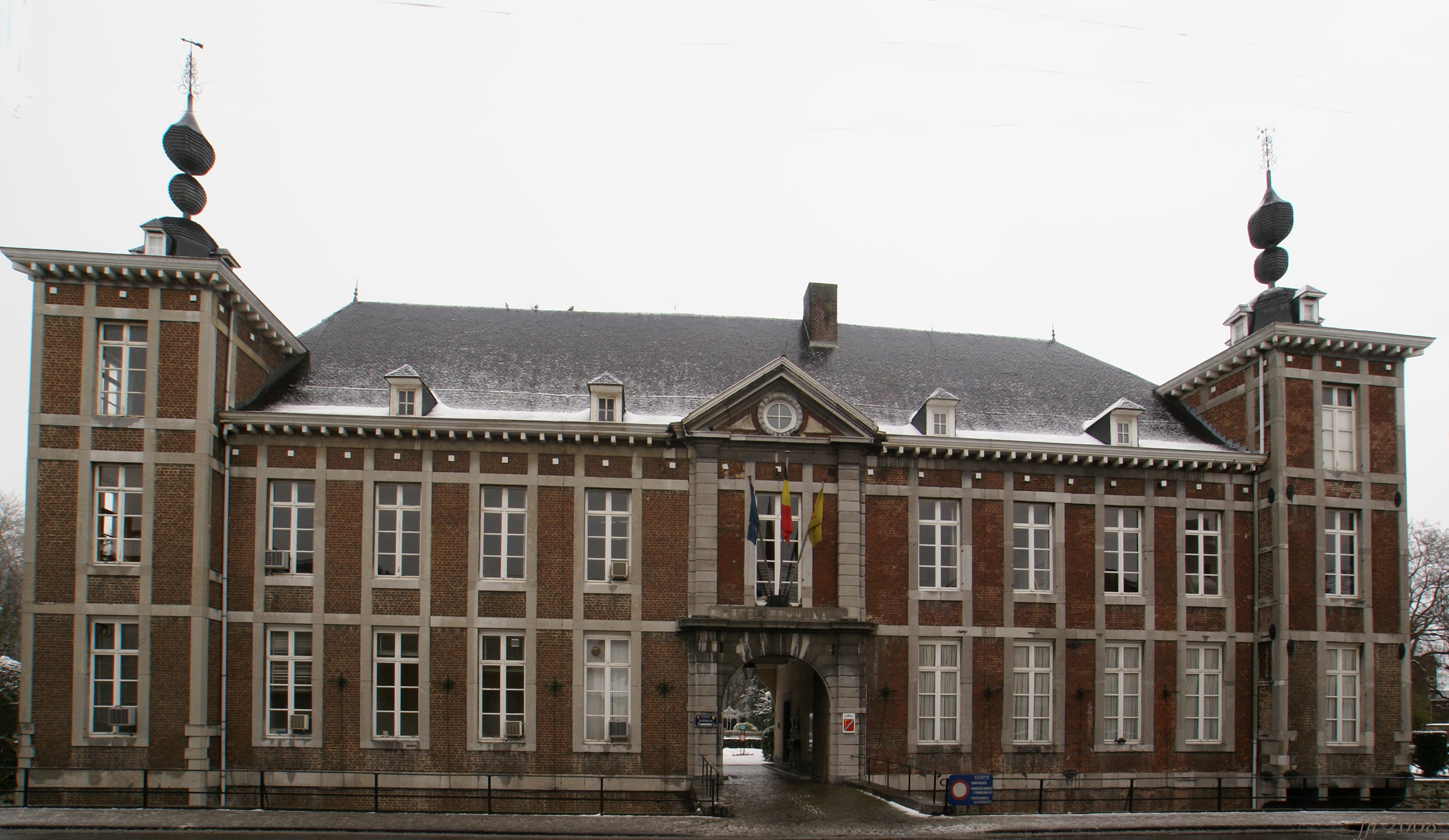
Château de la Petite Flémal'.

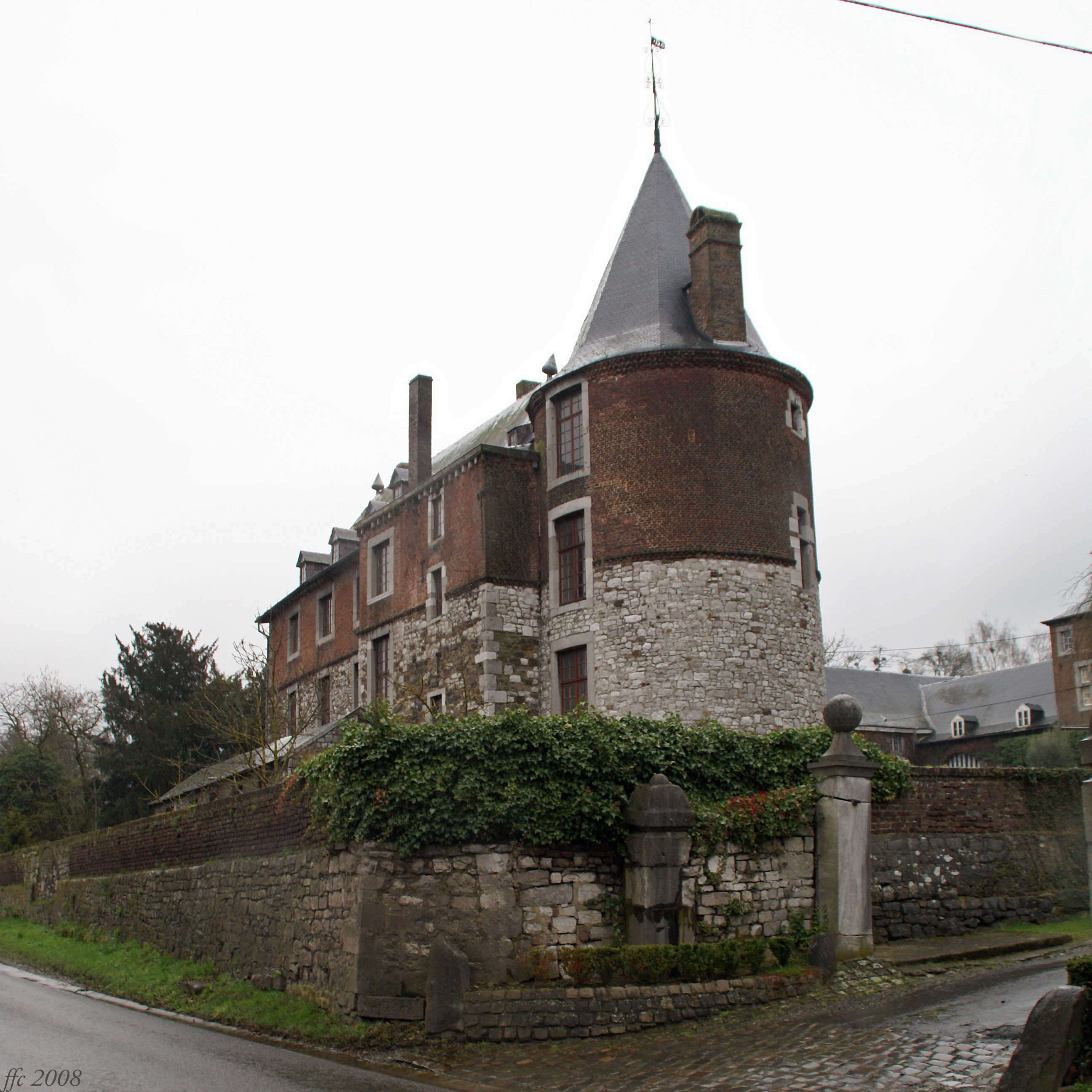
Château de Ramet.

The Fort de Flémalle is a large trapezoidal fort. Located on the former commune of Flémalle-Grande, overlooking the Meuse River and the routes to Namur, this fort was built according to the plans of General Henri Alexis Brialmont from 1888 to 1891 and faces the fort of Boncelles. In 1914, it was the site of fierce fighting between the Flémalle resistance and the German invaders who occupied and modified it. Re-armed in the 1930s, the fort still bears many scars from heavy bombardments. During World War II, it was at the Fort de Flémalle that Colonel Modart established the control post of the Liège Fortified Position.

In 1929, after a few years of abandonment, an underground fort was constructed beneath the Brialmont fort, which is why some ventilation towers were placed nearby to supply fresh air to the basements. This ventilation tower has been an artwork since 2014: carved on all sides, each cut represents, according to Lebanese artist Marie Zolamian, a day of waiting per prisoner in the fort.

The modernization of the fort in 1929 was accompanied by the addition of a dome with a 150 mm cannon, a dome with two 105 mm cannons, four clip-on domes with a 75 mm cannon, and a dome with a machine gun.

Regarding the fall of the fort, German General von Richthofen, known as the "Red Baron," writes in his war book Stukas! Strohmeyer, Curt. – Berlin: Verl. "Die Heimbücherei", he recounts:

The important fort still wasn't enough! Again 27 Junkers 87! One hit after another. Impact after impact. Bomb after bomb. And Flémalle surrenders, crushed by the Stukas. A weary garrison leaves the fort, whose turrets are caught in a vise and crushed, whose gorges are torn and entrances buried. Four times the commander and his squadron attacked Flémalle, until the fort was reduced to ruins and the stubborn defenders turned into human rubble under their blows.

It is also the only place in Belgium where a museum room is exclusively dedicated to American female pilots. The museum also displays the daily lives of civilians and, of course, soldiers. The fort is open to the public on the first Saturday of each month.

Fort de Flémalle

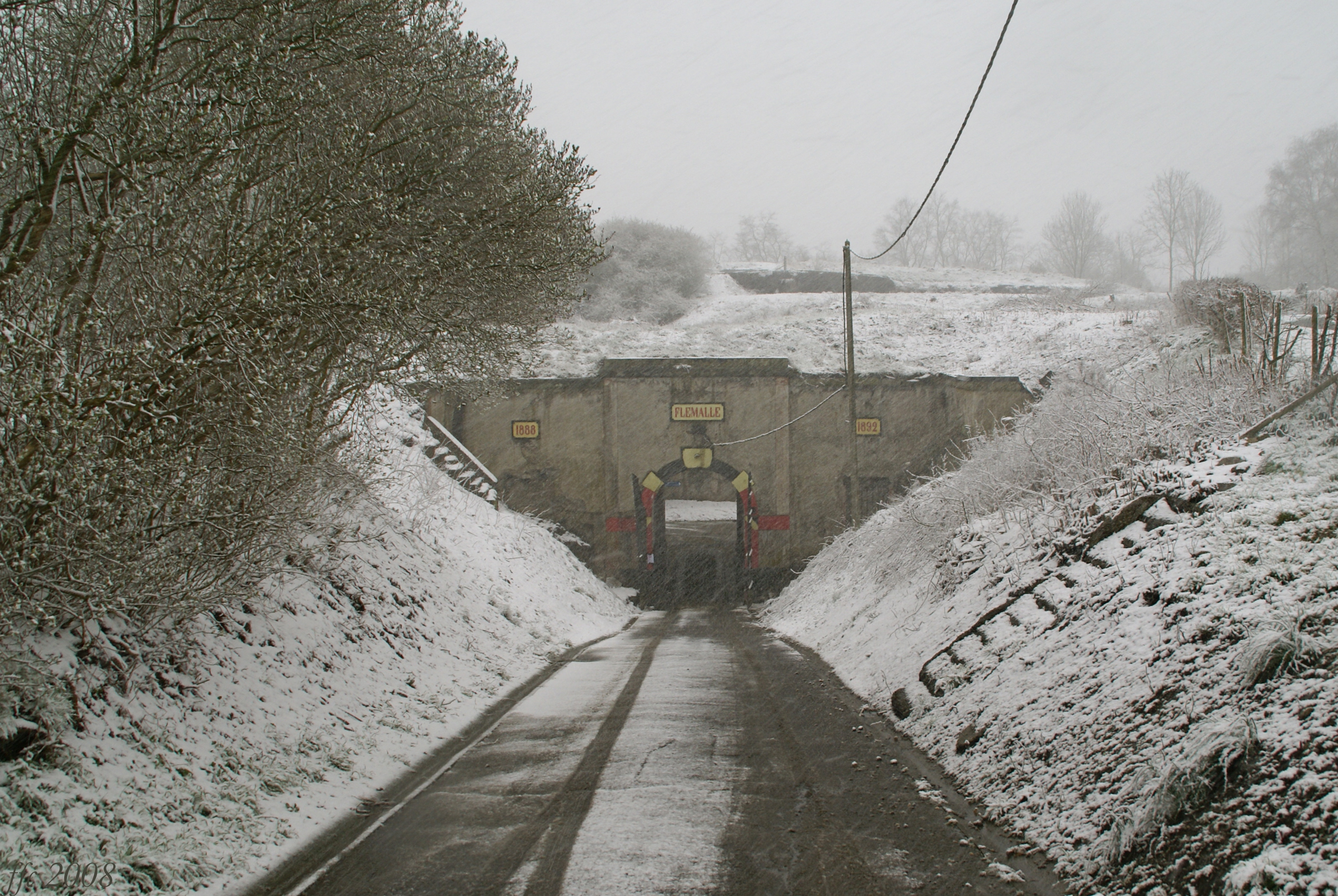
The entrance to Fort de Flémalle in winter.

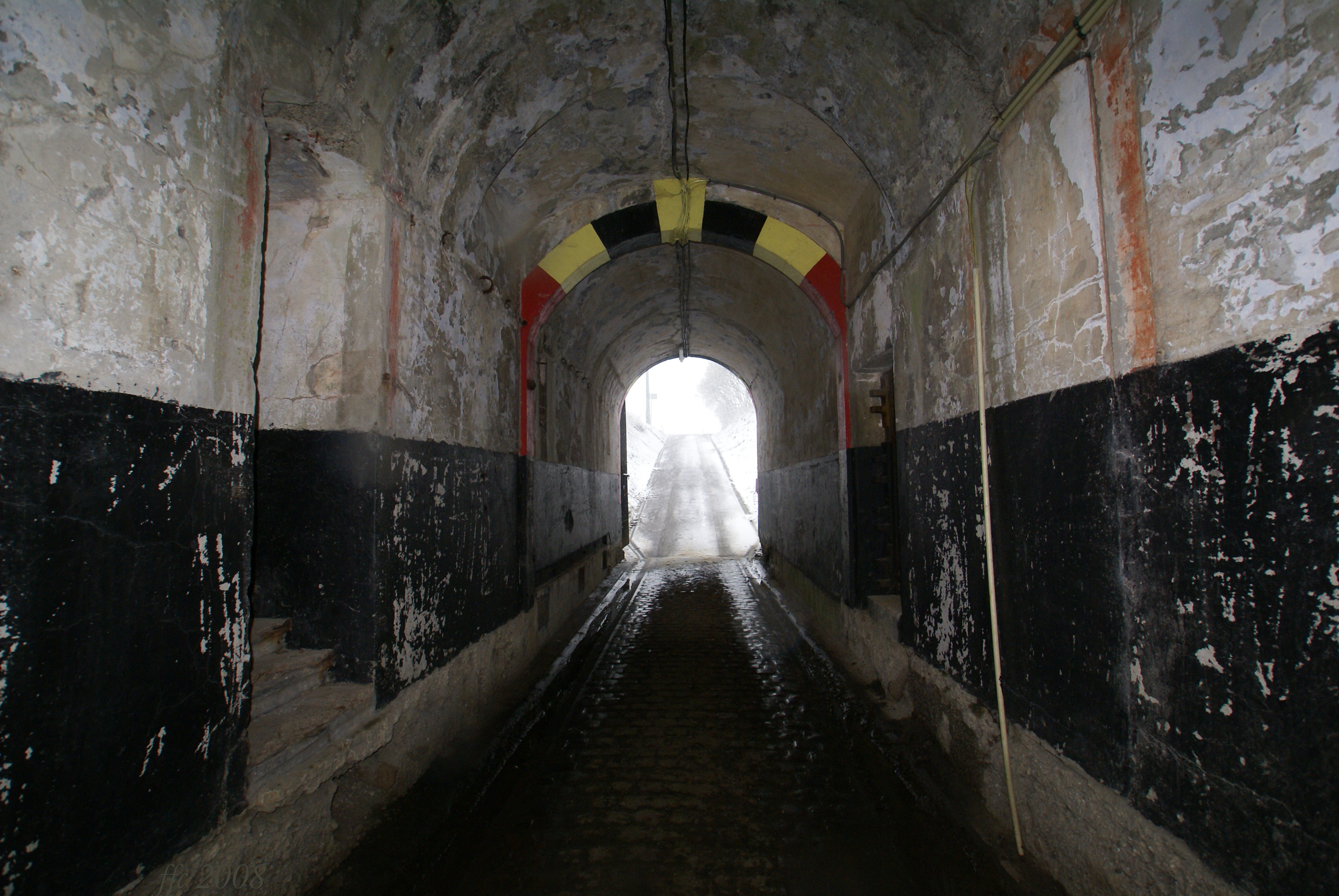
The entrance corridor of the fort, leading to the outside.

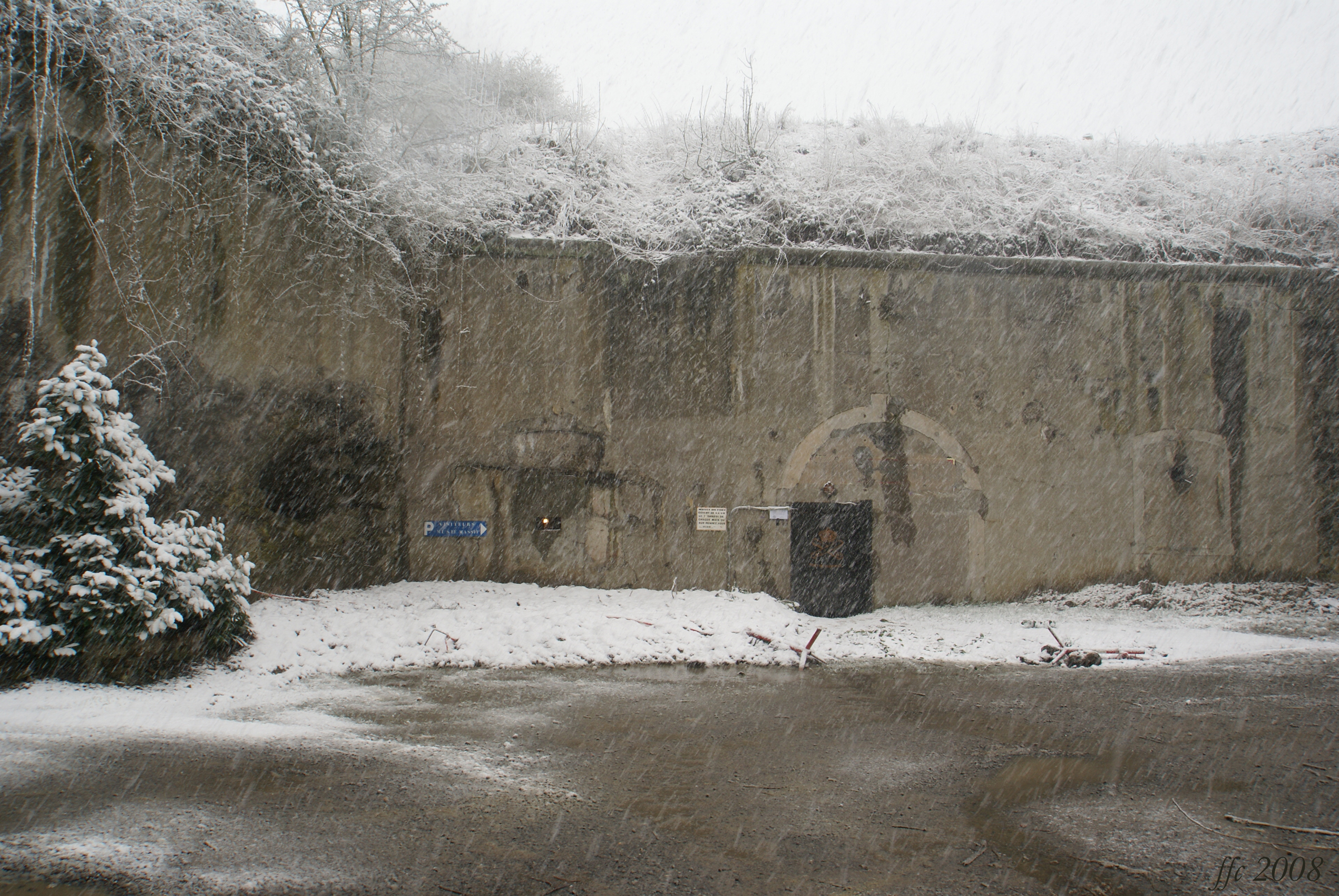
The inner courtyard of Fort de Flémalle in winter.

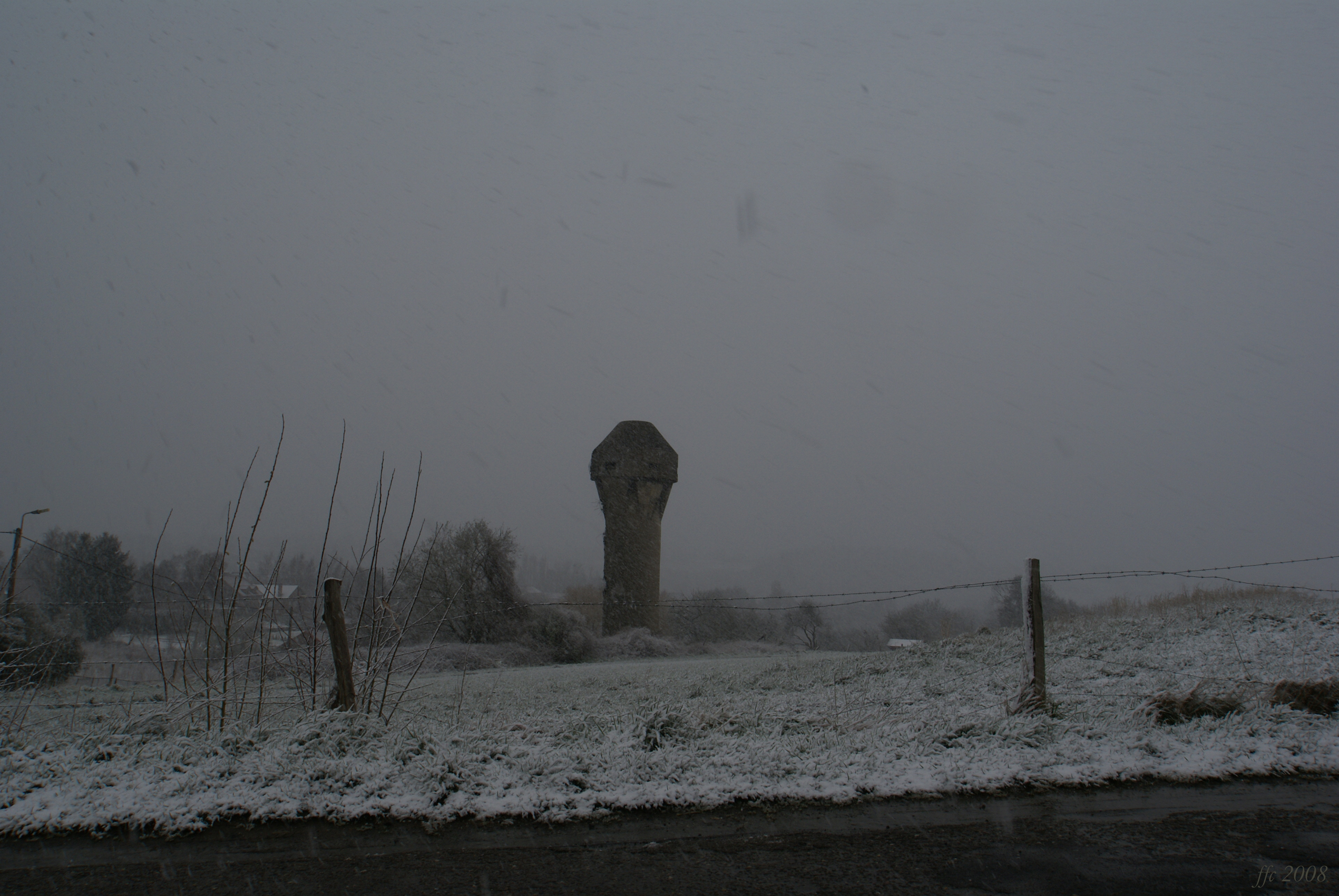
One of the ventilation towers of Fort de Flémalle in winter.

The village of Chokier is a prime example of Liège architectural heritage. The buildings in the center, around the square and the church, in particular, have hardly changed since their construction. Of course, the most famous monument is its castle, followed by its church, but strolling along the Chaussée de Chokier and its buildings is like taking a step back in time. On the eastern side of the village, you can notice a statue with a unique appearance. This monument is a tribute to Hippolyte Guillery, Chief Engineer of Bridges and Roads, who is said to have doubled the province's fortune. He made navigation on the Meuse between Liège and Namur possible year-round by constructing about ten locks. He also redefined the course of the Meuse and removed the islands between the banks at Flémalle.

Village of Chokier

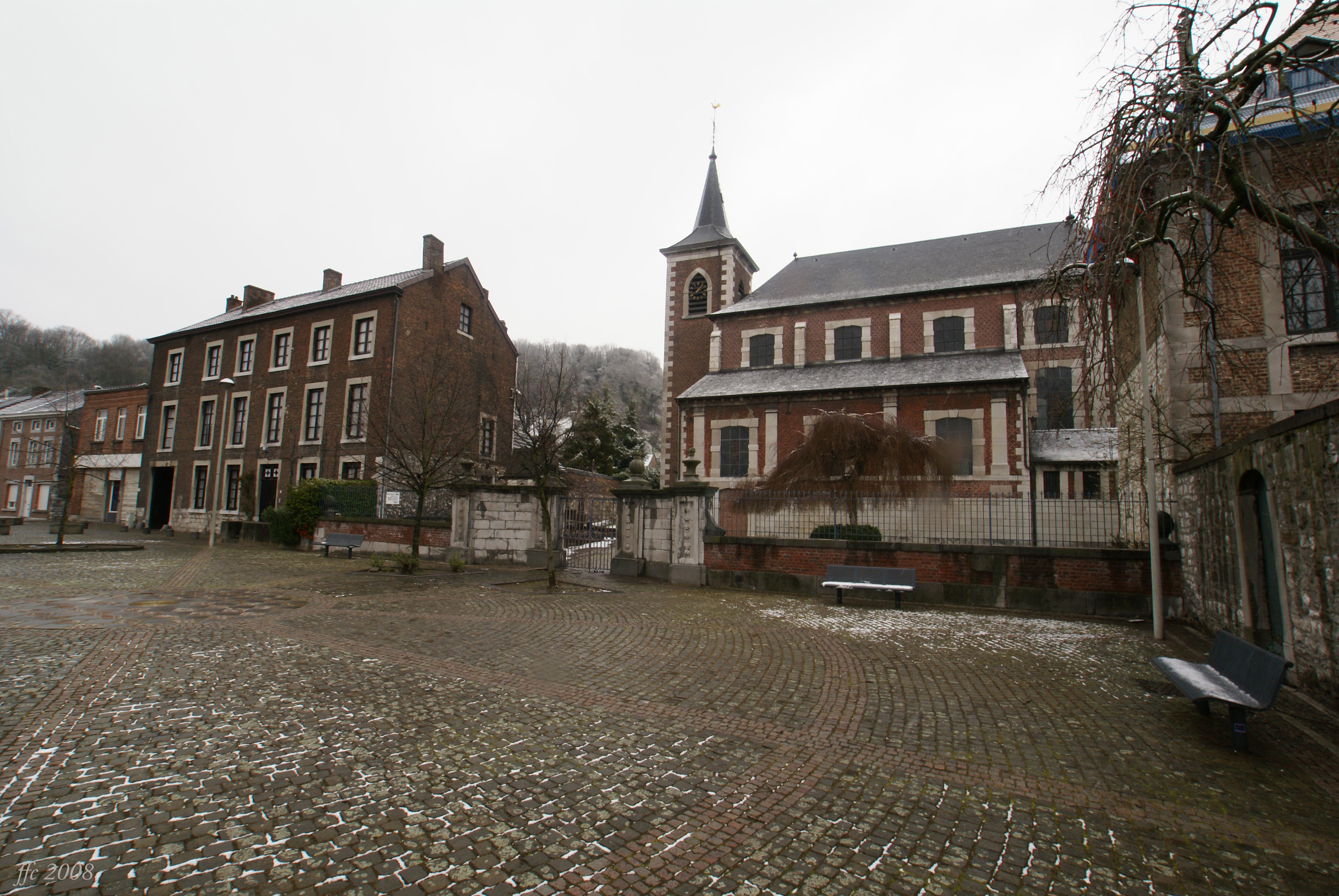
The village square of Chokier in winter.

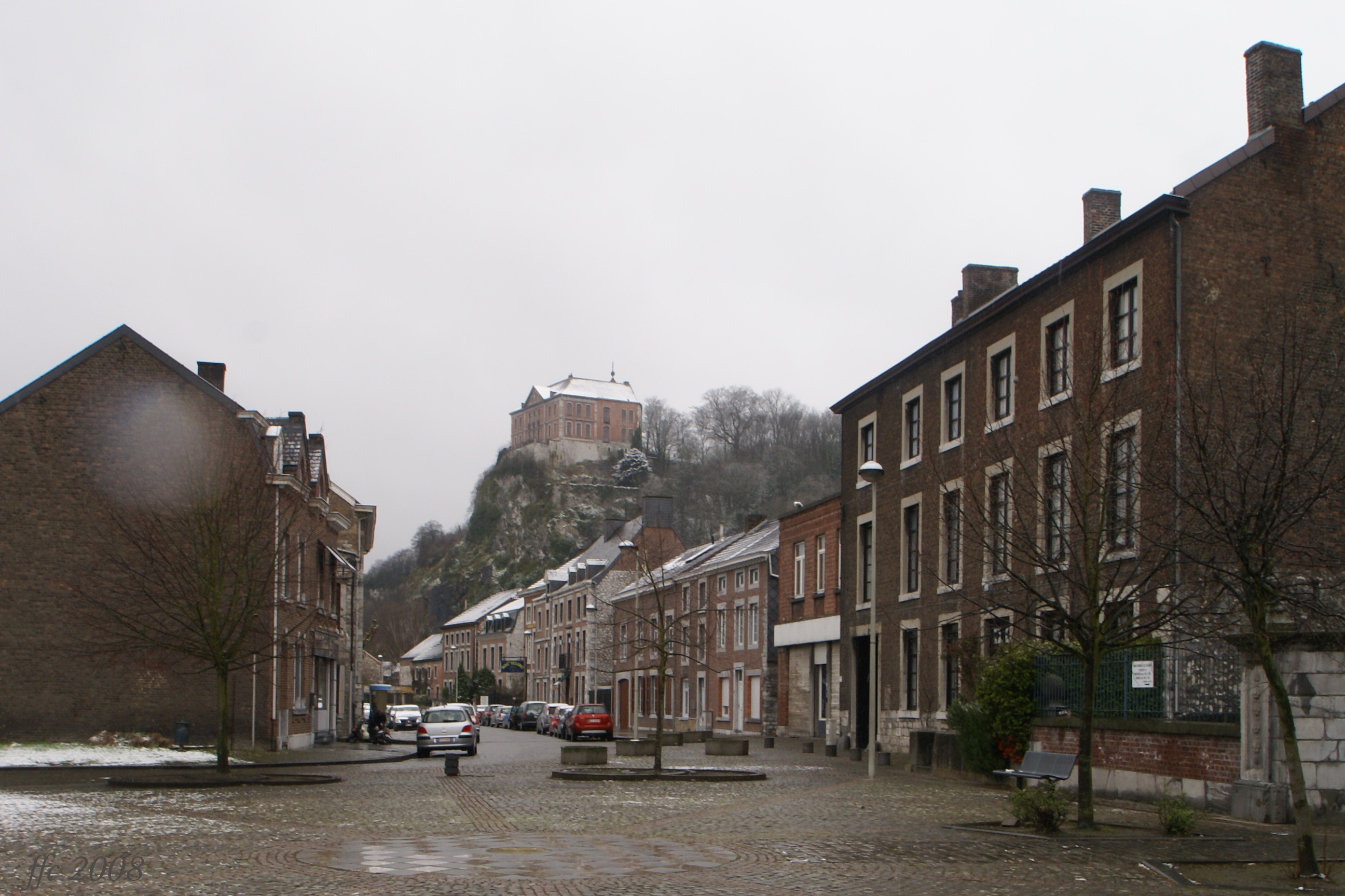
Chaussée de Chokier, with a view of the castle in winter.

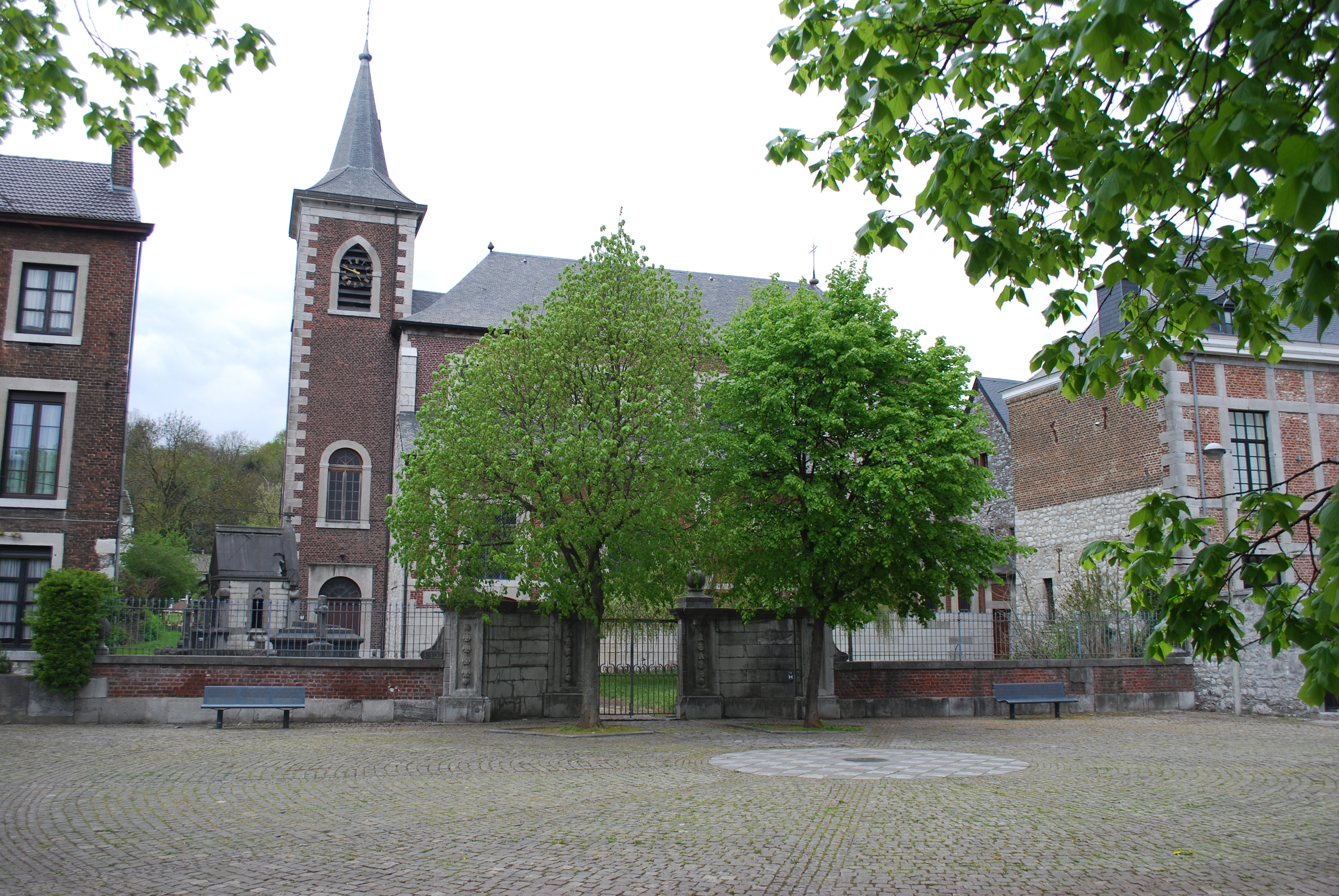
Saint Marcelin Church of Chokier.

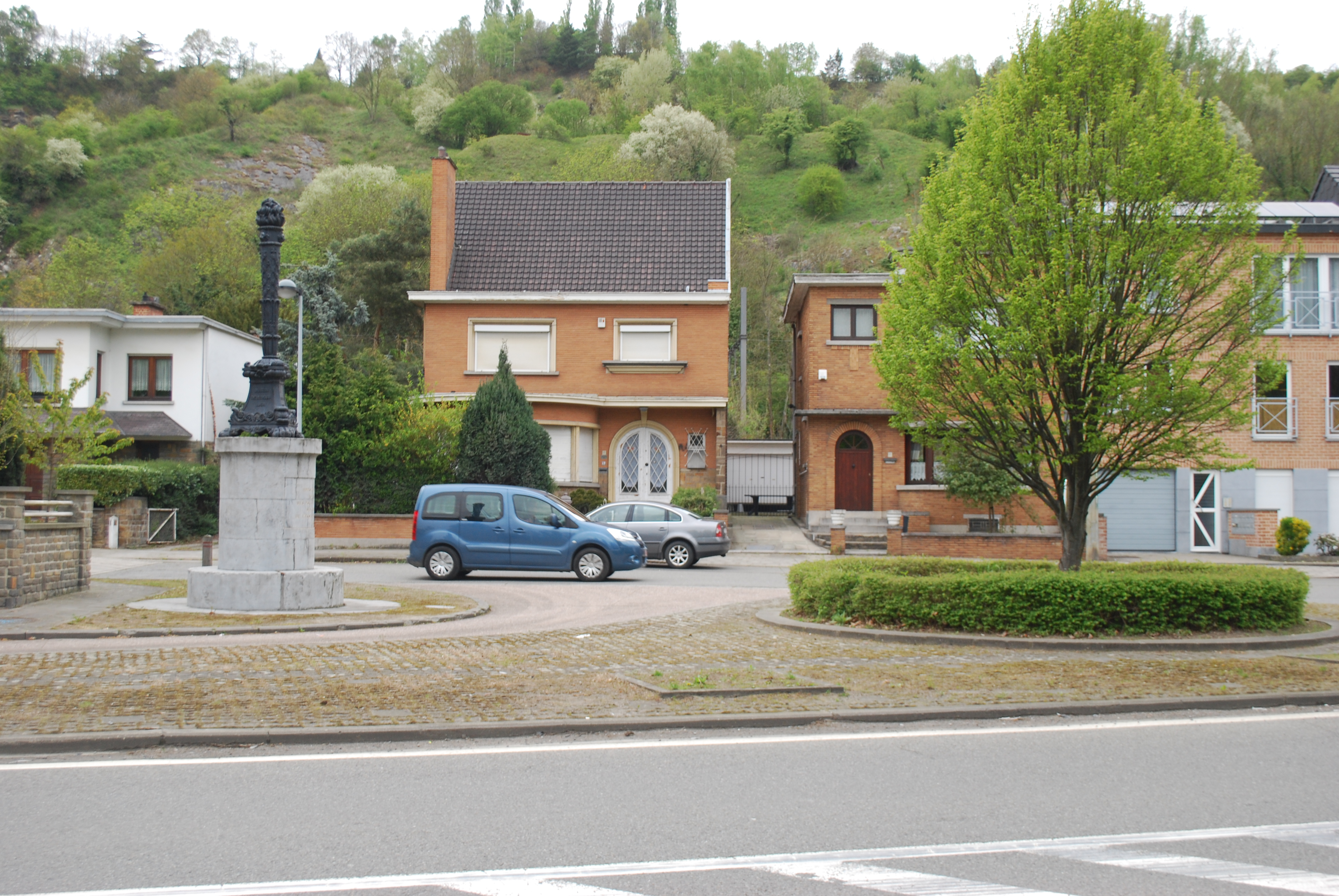
The monument dedicated to Hippolyte Guillery at the eastern entrance of the village.

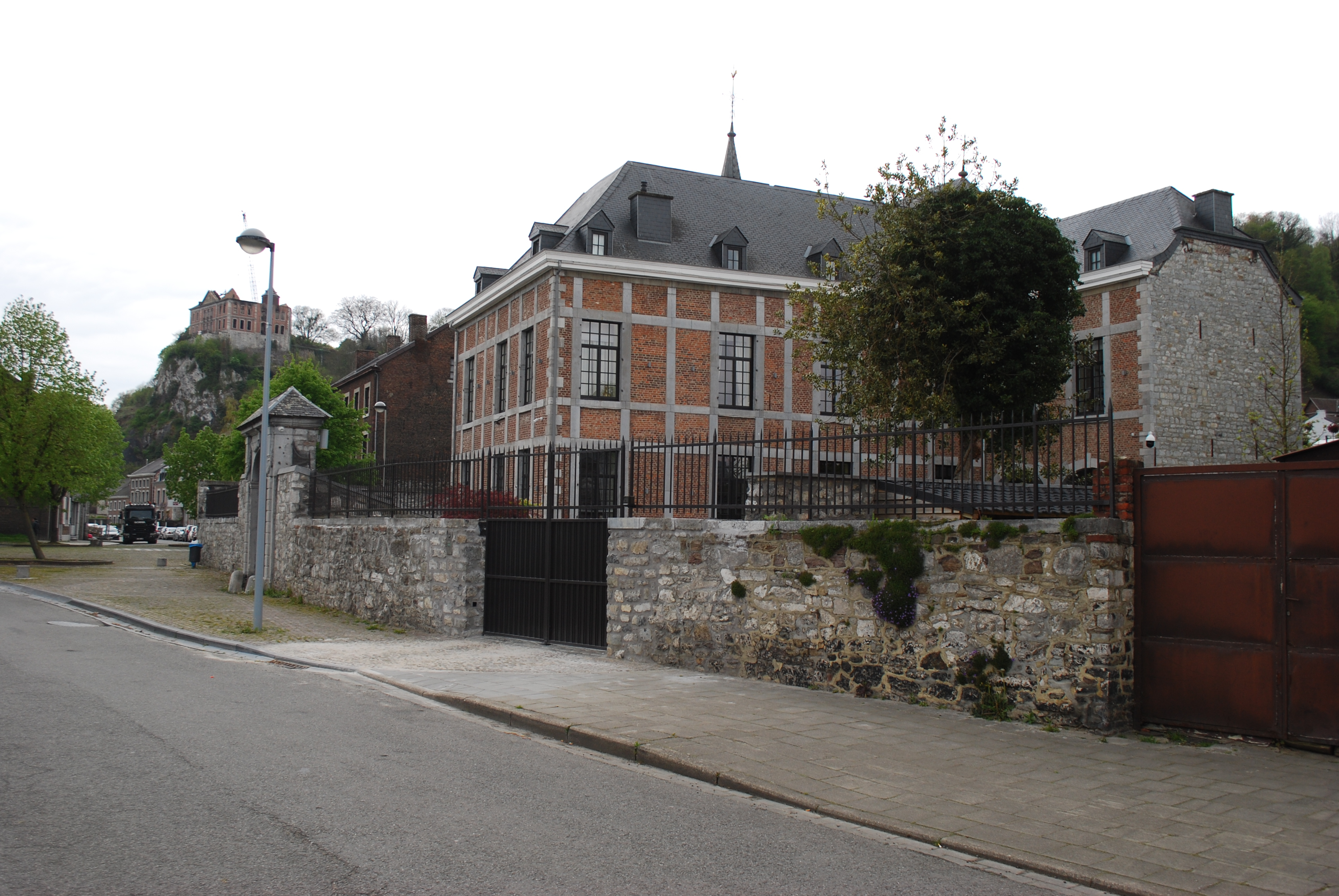
Typical village building attached to the church.

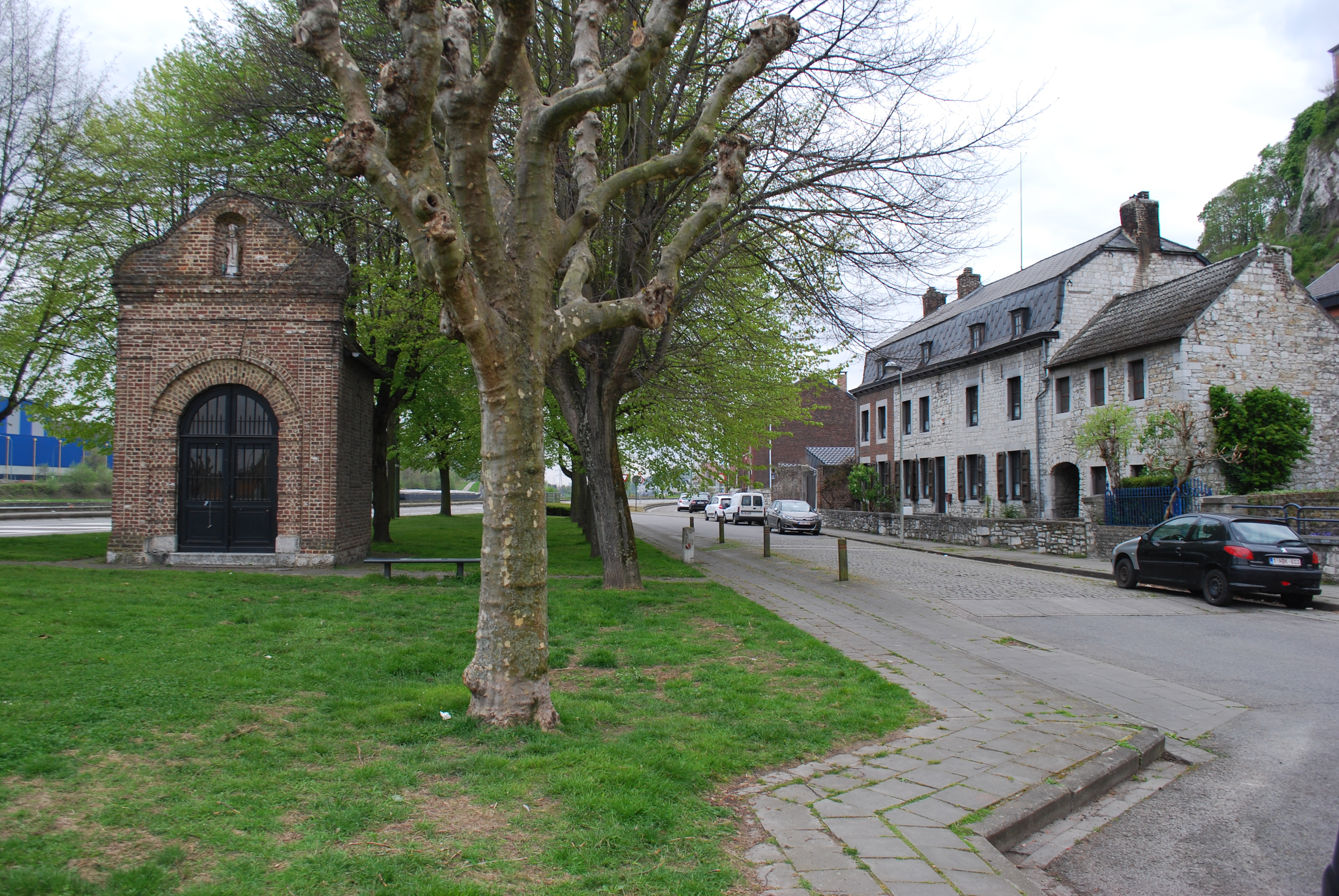
The chapel located in the green space along the quays.

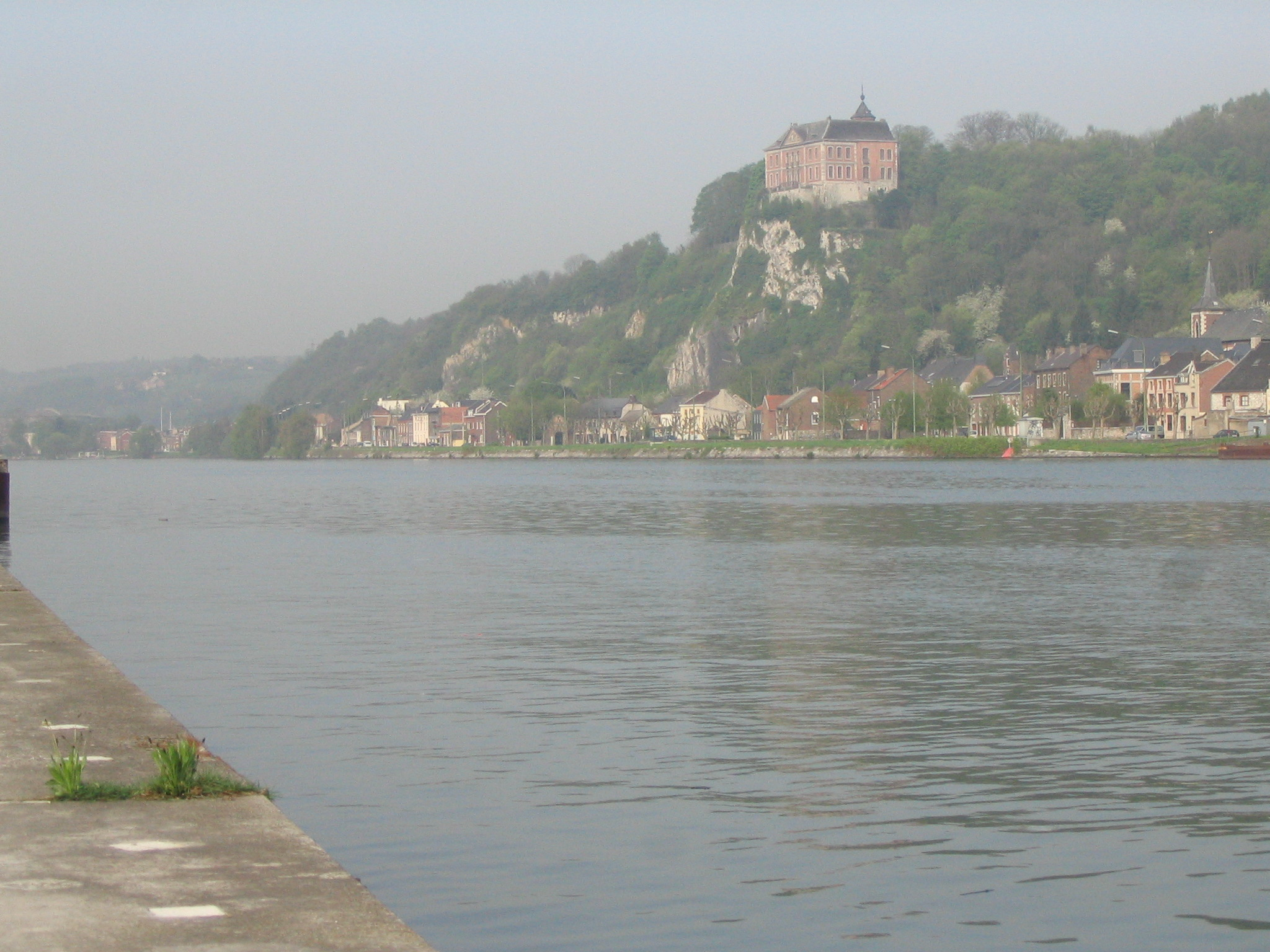
Full view of the village.

The Châtaigneraie is a manor house built between 1830 and 1840, set in a classified park protected by the Walloon Region, and now houses the Walloon Center for Contemporary Art. The property belongs to the Municipality of Flémalle, which maintains it. The Châtaigneraie has housed this center since 1979, and it was only in 1984 that the Fédération Wallonie-Bruxelles recognized the site for the promotion of contemporary art.

=== Château and Park of the Petite Flémal' ===
This castle (50°35′57.10″N 05°28′12.21″E) located on the Grand' Route has housed municipal services since 1938. It was built in several stages: the right wing was constructed during the 17th century. Then the left wing, dating from the 18th century. Finally, a last wing extending towards the park was built in 1984. The castle is accompanied by a park featuring various garden styles: Italian, French, and an English garden.

=== The Chockier Quarry: Nature Reserve ===
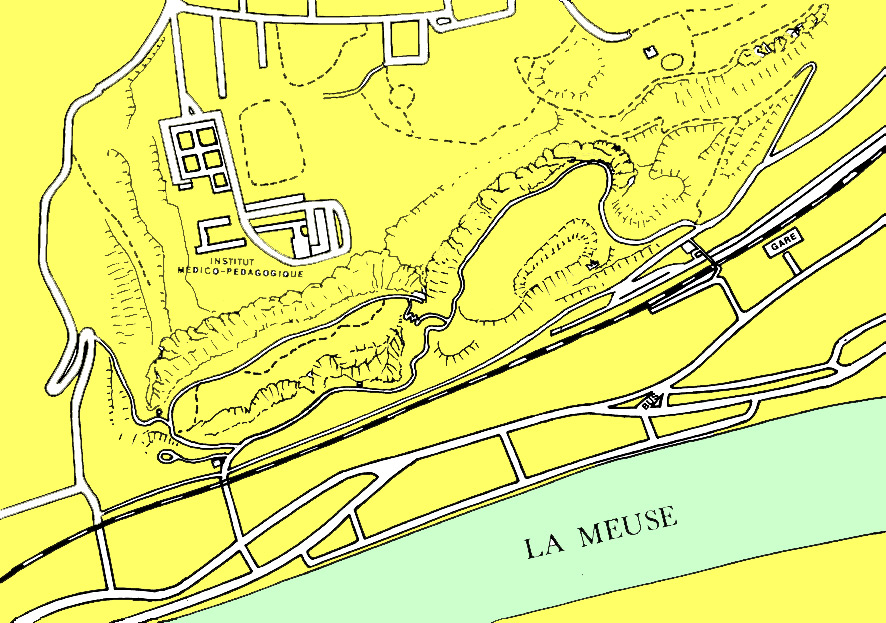
Map of the Chockier nature reserve trails by Théo Halkin

Under the guidance of Études & Environnement asbl, efforts to preserve the old Sacré quarries began in 1994. Well-exposed to the sun, these quarries – on the left bank of the Meuse – had developed a very interesting flora and fauna, which were the subject of a nature guide thesis. In 1996, protection of 27 ha was achieved, and a 30-year agreement was signed between the Natagora association and the municipality of Flémalle. (Note: L. Malchair, Flémalle: d'Aigremont à l'Ermitage. Thesis presented for obtaining the nature guide diploma, year 1993–1994. Center for Continuing Education for Nature Protection, Liège, 1994, 205 p.)

=== Caves and Prehistoric Museum ===
The Prehistomuseum of Ramioul is an educational tourism center focused on Prehistory in Belgium.

In its vicinity are several caves that have yielded significant archaeological materials, some of which are displayed at the museum of the prehistoric site.

== People ==
- François Neuville (1912–1986), cyclist
- André Cools (1927–1991), politician
- Jean-Marie Léonard (1943–2021), politician
- Jean-Pierre Dardenne (1951), director, screenwriter, and producer
- Luc Dardenne (1954), director, screenwriter, and producer
- Thomas Doret (1996), actor
- Paul Roekaerts (1939), athlete
- Landry Mulemo (1986), international footballer
- Sébastien Pocognoli (1987), international footballer
- Thomas Doret (1996), actor

== Bibliography ==
- Albert Chatelet (1996). Robert Campin: le Maître de Flémalle: la fascination du quotidien (in French). Antwerp: Fonds Mercator. p. 379. ISBN 9061533643.
- ^{[{{{2}}}]} Alexis Zimmer, "Le brouillard mortel de la vallée de la Meuse" (December 1930). Naturalization of the catastrophe, in Débordements industriels : Environnement, territoire et conflit (18th-21st centuries), Rennes, Presses universitaires de Rennes, 2013.
- Anonymous, Les alunières à Flémalle et dans la vallée de la Meuse, Commission historique de Flémalle, Flémalle-Haute, 1992, 144 p.
- ^{[{{{2}}}]} Edmond Fellingue, Les tramways au pays de Liège, vol. 1: Les tramways urbains, Belgian Group for the Promotion and Tourist Operation of Rail Transport (GTF), 1985, 398 p.
- ^{[{{{2}}}]} Edmond Fellingue, Les tramways au pays de Liège, vol. 2: Les chemins de fer vicinaux, Belgian Group for the Promotion and Tourist Operation of Rail Transport (GTF), 1985, 398 p.
- Henin H., Les rochers de Flémalle-Haute et de Chokier. 70th excursion of the Liège Botanical Society (31 May 1942), Lejeunia, 1943, 7: 3–12.
- ^{[{{{2}}}]} Jacques Cloes, Le Mouvement ouvrier à Flémalle-Grande de 1830 à 1914, Liège, University of Liège. Faculty of Philosophy and Letters, Thesis/Memoir, 1986–1987.
- Michel Dethier, Gaby Viskens, and Jos Bruers, Les Hétéroptères des anciennes carrières de Flémalle et d'Engis (province de Liège, Belgique), Notes fauniques de Gembloux, No. 57, 2005.
- Michel Dethier and Jean-Marie Hubart, Evolution de la faune invertébrée des grottes de Ramioul (commune de Flémalle, province de Liège, Belgique), Bulletin des Chercheurs de la Wallonie, hors-série No. 3, 2010.
- ^{[{{{2}}}]} P. Hauteclair, M. Derume, and C. Bauffe, La faune des vertébrés (Herpétofaune – Avifaune – Mammafaune) de quelques terrils miniers et haldes calaminaires de Wallonie (Belgique). Bilan des inventaires réalisés en 2006–2007, Natura Mosana, 61, No. 3, 2008.
