= Five Tumuli of Omal =

- Les cinq tumuli d'Omal
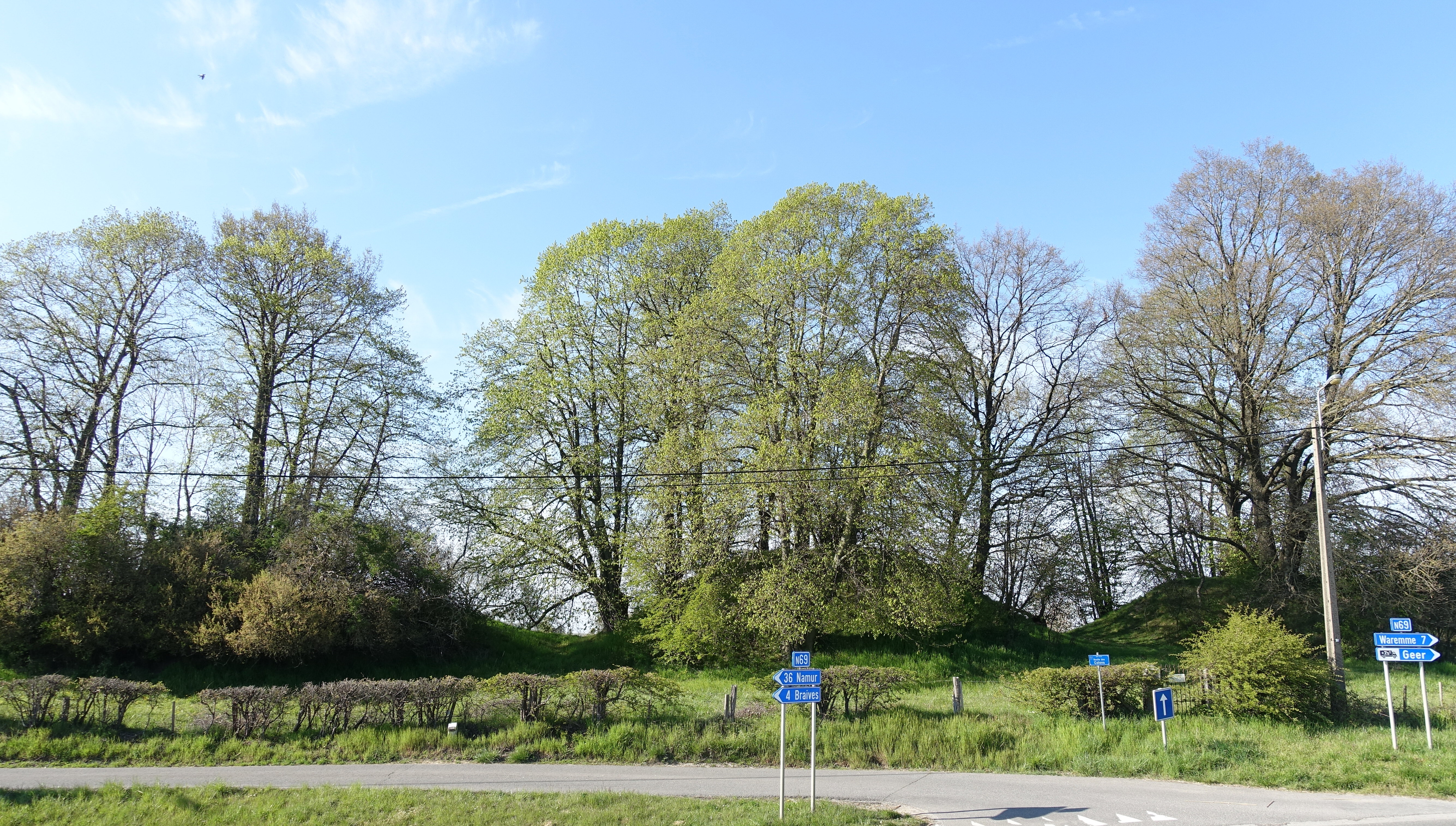
- The northern tumuli of Omal
- Type: Tumulus
- Location: Geer, Belgium, Liège Province, Belgium

History
- Built: Gallo-Roman period

Site notes
- Height: 4 to 5.2 m (13 to 17 ft)

The Five Tumuli of Omal, locally known as Les cinq tombes (The Five Graves), are a group of tumuli located in Omal, a village in the municipality of Geer, Belgium, in the Liège Province of Belgium.

They are listed as part of the Exceptional Heritage of Wallonia since 20 November 1984.

== Location ==
The tumuli are situated in the Hesbaye village of Omal, near the Colons Alley and the N69 national road, known as the Roman road since it follows the ancient Roman road connecting Bavay to Cologne. The first four tumuli are aligned to the north of this road, while the fifth is located off-axis to the south of the road, behind a war memorial.

== History ==
These relatively small tumuli have been subject to looting over the centuries. However, excavations conducted in the 19th century uncovered several artifacts, including a short sword and an ivory scabbard. These finds are displayed at the Museum of Art and History and the Curtius Museum in Linear Pottery culture.

Omal is a significant archaeological site in Hesbaye, renowned for the discovery of the earliest linear pottery culture sites, which gave its name to the Linear Pottery culture.

== Description ==
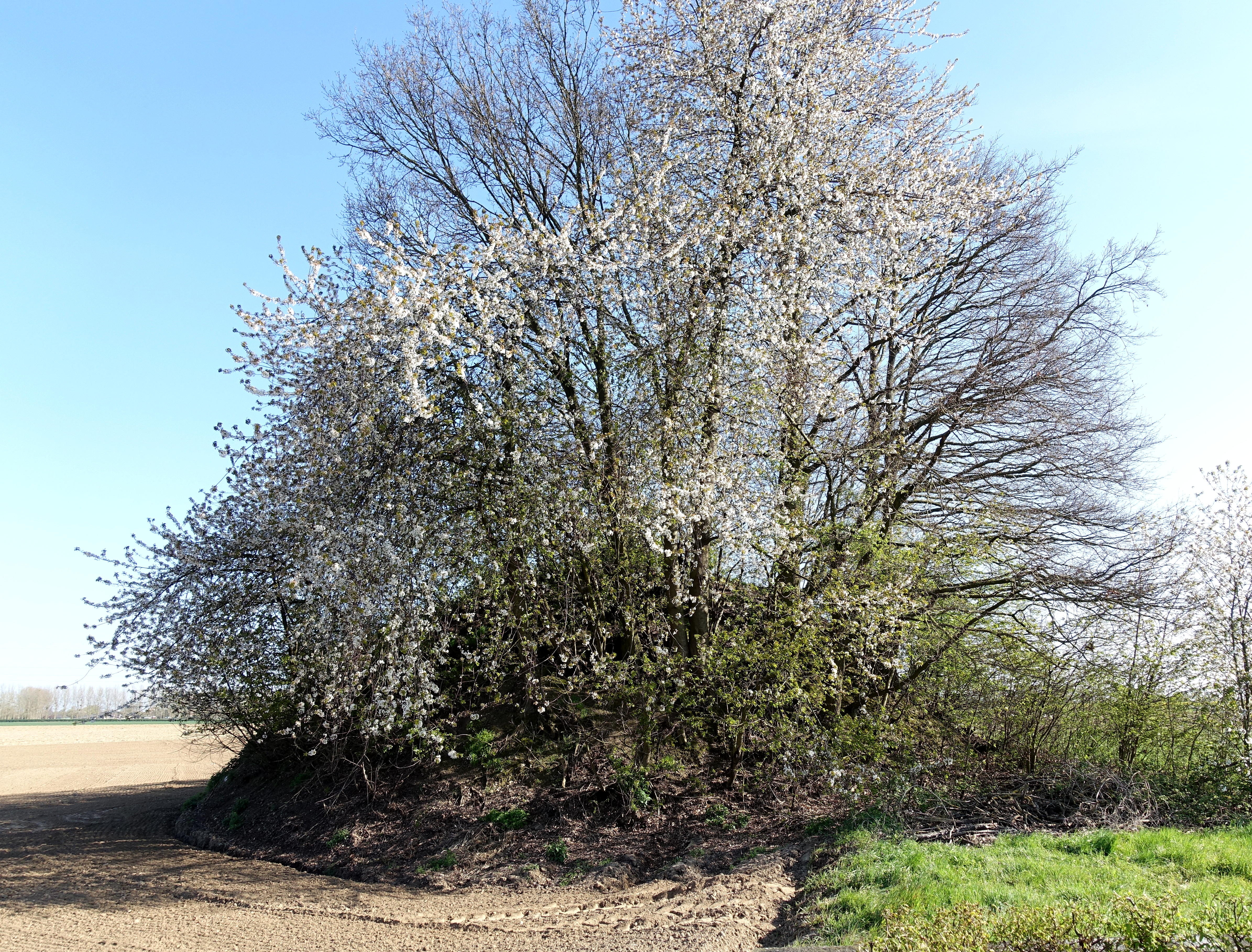
Le tumulus sud d'Omal

The tumuli are covered with trees and have a maximum diameter of about 20 meters and a height of at least 4 meters. The tumulus located south of the Roman road has a height of 5.20 meters.

== Heritage ==
The tumuli are listed on the protected heritage list of Geer and are part of the Exceptional Heritage of Wallonia.
