= Abolens =

Village and district in Hannut, Liège Province, Belgium

- Municipality
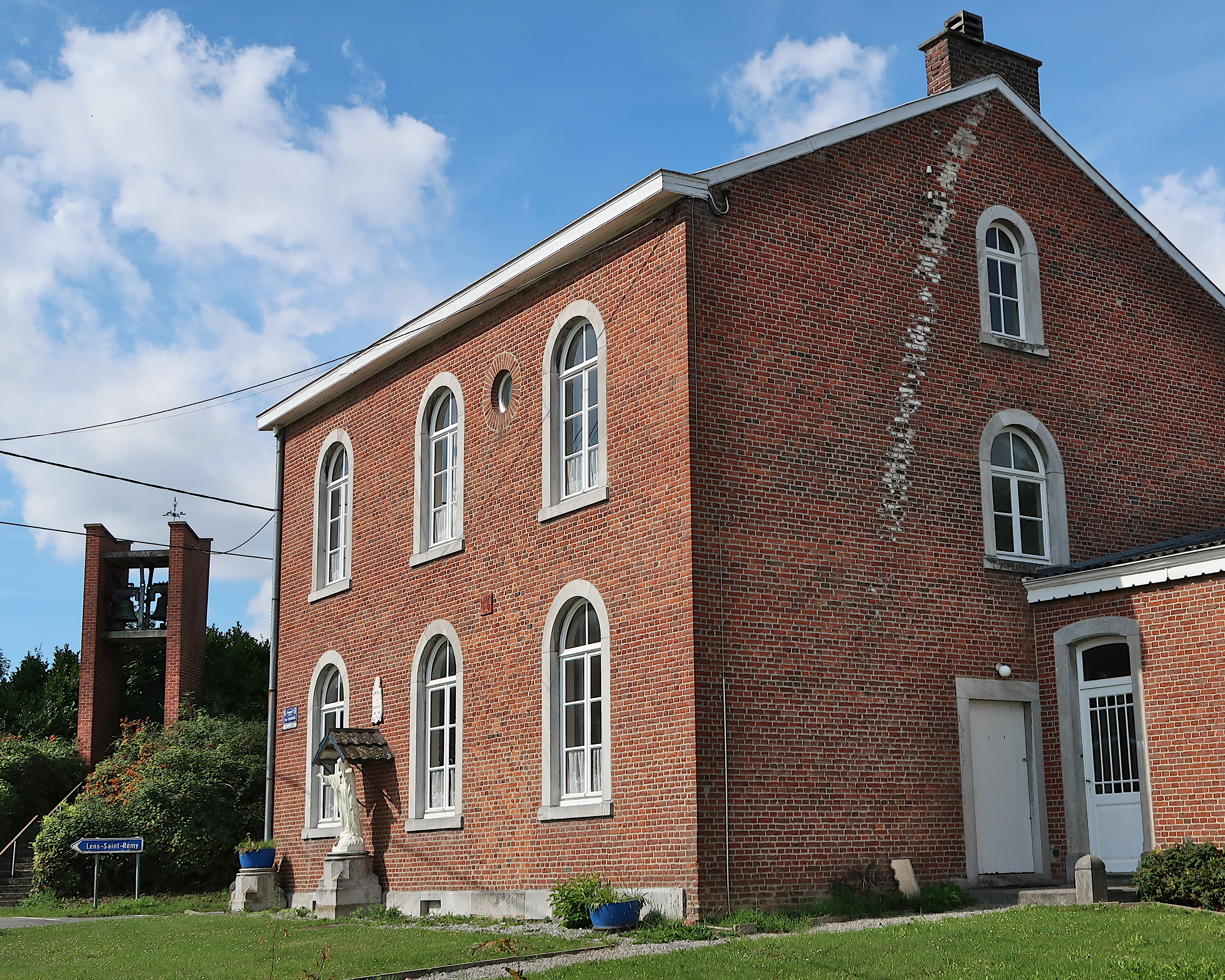
- The modern campanile of Abolens, built in 1969

- Location of Abolens in the municipality of Hannut
- Interactive map of Abolens
- Location in Belgium
- Coordinates: 50°40′20″N 5°08′59″E
- Country: Belgium
- Community: French Community
- Region: Wallonia
- Province: Liège
- Arrondissement: Waremme
- Postal codes: 4280
- NIS code: 64034F
- Area codes: 019

Abolens (French pronunciation: [abɔlɛ̃]; Walloon: Å Bôlin) (Note: Jean-Marie Pierret, Phonétique historique du français et notions de phonétique générale, Peeters, Louvain-la-Neuve, 1994, p. 105.) is a village and a district of the municipality of Hannut, located in the province of Liège, Belgium. The village is situated near the source of the river Jeker, which rises within its territory, as well as the Grande Bek.

== History ==
The earliest recorded mention of Abolens dates to the year 1250, when it was referred to as Abolenz. The name is thought to derive from the Germanic god Aboldus. Over the centuries, Abolens underwent several administrative changes. During the French Revolution, it was merged with the neighbouring village of Poucet. It later regained independence, only to be remerged with Lens-Saint-Remy. A law passed on 9 August 1881 restored Abolens' municipal status. Following the municipal mergers of 1971, it became part of the municipality of Hannut.

== Landmarks ==
The Church of Saint Maurice was constructed in 1880 but was demolished in 1969 due to the risk of collapse. A modern brick campanile was erected on the site to preserve the original bell, but the village has had no church building since.

Several traditional Vierkantshoeve (square farmsteads) are preserved in the area.

== Geography ==
Abolens lies in a gently rolling landscape at an elevation of approximately 136 metres near the site of the former church. It is located in the drainage basin of the Jeker river, which has its source in the vicinity.

== Demographics ==
As of 1 January 2020, Abolens had a population of 295 residents over an area of 2.71 km², yielding a population density of approximately 109 inhabitants per square kilometre.

=== Historical population ===
Population figures (census data):

- 1881: 370
- 1890: 408
- 1900: 428
- 1910: 378
- 1920: 359
- 1930: 355
- 1947: 313
- 1961: 253
- 1970: 206

== Neighbouring villages ==
Lens-Saint-Servais, Blehen, Poucet, Trognée, Geer

== Notable people ==
- Cian Uijtdebroeks (born 2003), professional road cyclist

== See also ==
- Hannut
- Jeker
