= Bertrée =

Coordinates: 50°42′N 5°05′E

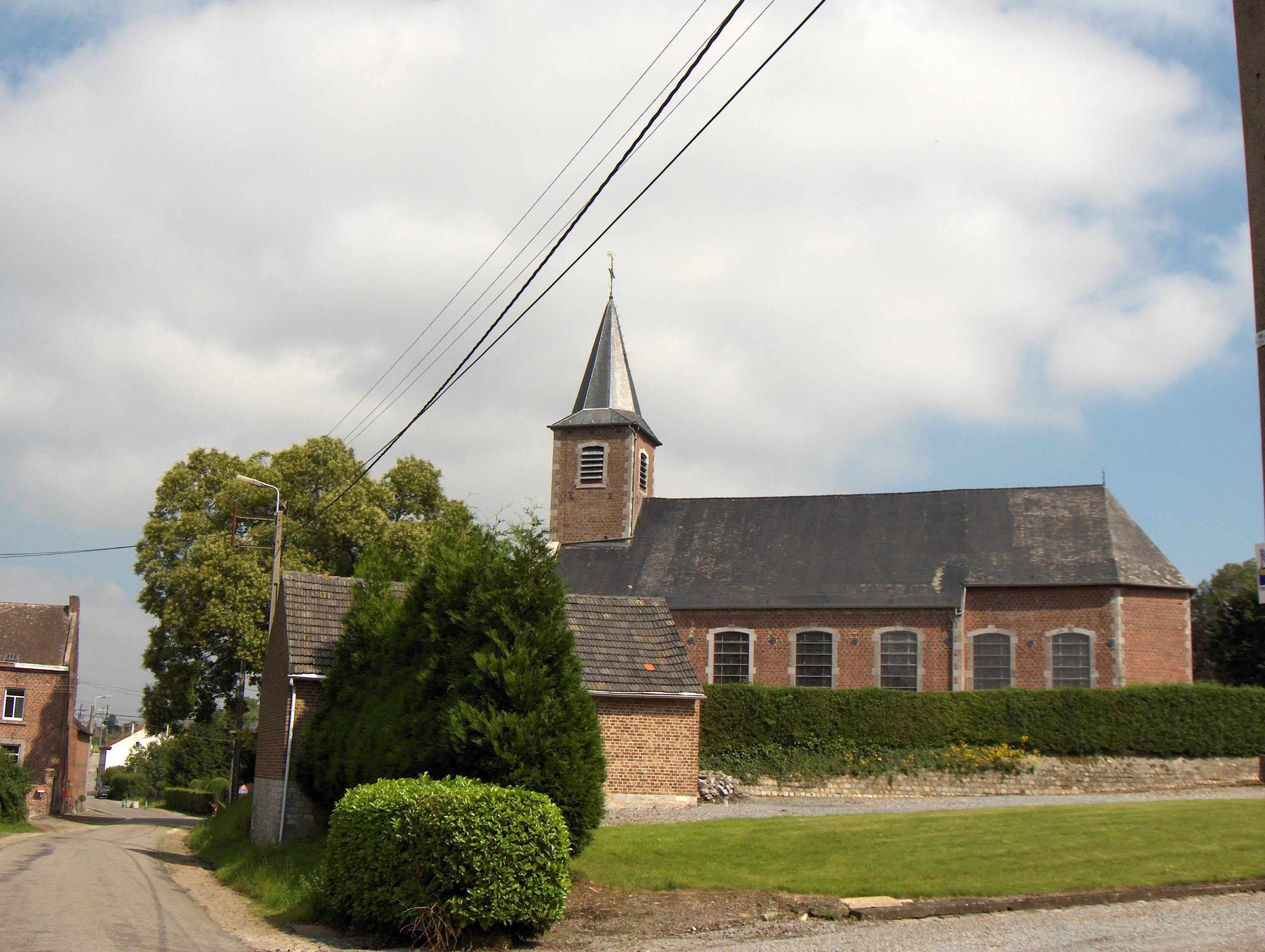
Bertrée's church

Bertrée (French pronunciation: [bɛʁtʁe]; Walloon: Bietrêye) is a village of Wallonia and a district of the municipality of Hannut, located in the province of Liége, Belgium.

It has a surface area of 2,78 km² and has a population of 414 (1 January 2007).

== Geography ==
Bertrée borders in the north to Walshoutem (at the language border to the Flemish region), in the east to Cras-Avernas and Trognée, in the south to Poucet and Hannut, en finally in the west to Avernas-le-Bauduin.
