= List of protected heritage sites in Lincent =

This table shows an overview of the protected heritage sites in the Walloon town Lincent. This list is part of Belgium's national heritage.

Object	Year/architect	Town/section	Address	Coordinates	Number^{?}	Image
Ruins of the old church of Saint-Pierre ^{(nl)} ^{(fr)}		Lincent	rue de la Fontaine	50.710217°N 5.031288°E	64047-CLT-0001-01 Info	Ruines oude kerk Saint-Pierre
Church Saint-Christophe ^{(nl)} ^{(fr)}		Lincent		50.738784°N 5.029802°E	64047-CLT-0002-01 Info	Kerk Saint-Christophe
Pastorage ^{(nl)} ^{(fr)}		Lincent	rue Saint-Christophe, n°2	50.738203°N 5.029810°E	64047-CLT-0003-01 Info	Pastorie (gevels en daken), muur rond tuin en portaal

== See also ==
- List of protected heritage sites in Liège (province)
- Lincent
