= Museum of Lithographed Tin Cans =

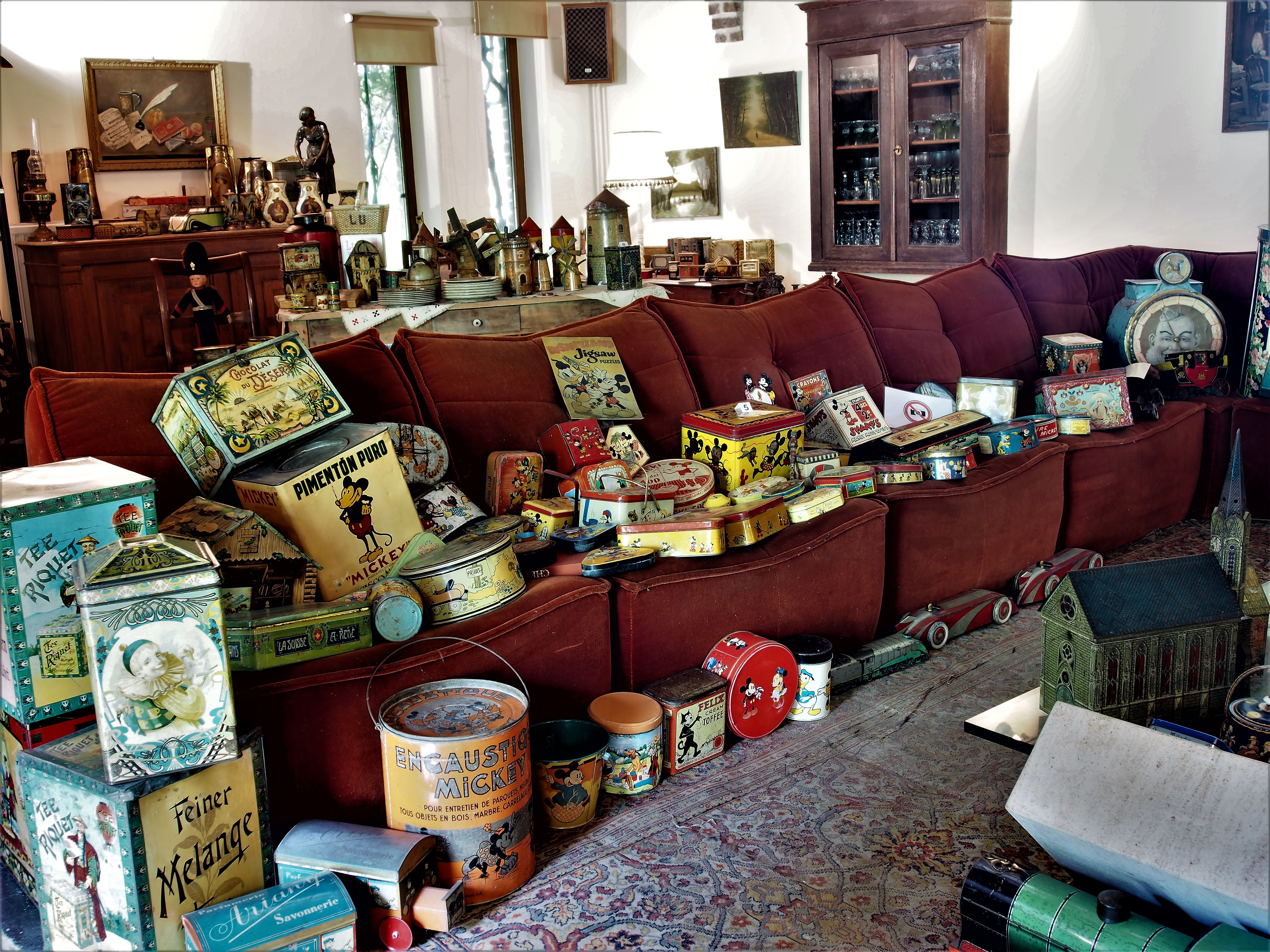
- Tin cans in the museum

- Location within Belgium
- Location: Rue du Condroz 5-10, Grand-Hallet, Belgium
- Coordinates: 50.689357°N 5.044750°E
- Collection size: over 50.000
- Visitors: 500
- Director: Yvette Dardenne

The Museum of Lithographed Tin Cans is a museum in Grand-Hallet in the Hannuit area in Belgium. The tin cans dating from 1868 were collected starting in 1988 by Yvette Dardenne (1938-2025), the founder and owner of the museum. It is the largest collection of lithographed tins in the world. The collection is spread over three buildings and is sorted into themes as much as possible. Visiting the museum is only possible by appointment. A visit with a tour takes about two hours. For children there is also a mini-zoo.

== Collection ==
As of 2017 the collection exceeds 57000 tin cans. Some remarkable items are:

- A 100000 Reichsmark Bonbon, E Wolff's Nachfolger, Strassburg-Neudorf
- A lunch box with images of President Paul Kruger
- A KLM plane
- The ship Normandie

== Images ==
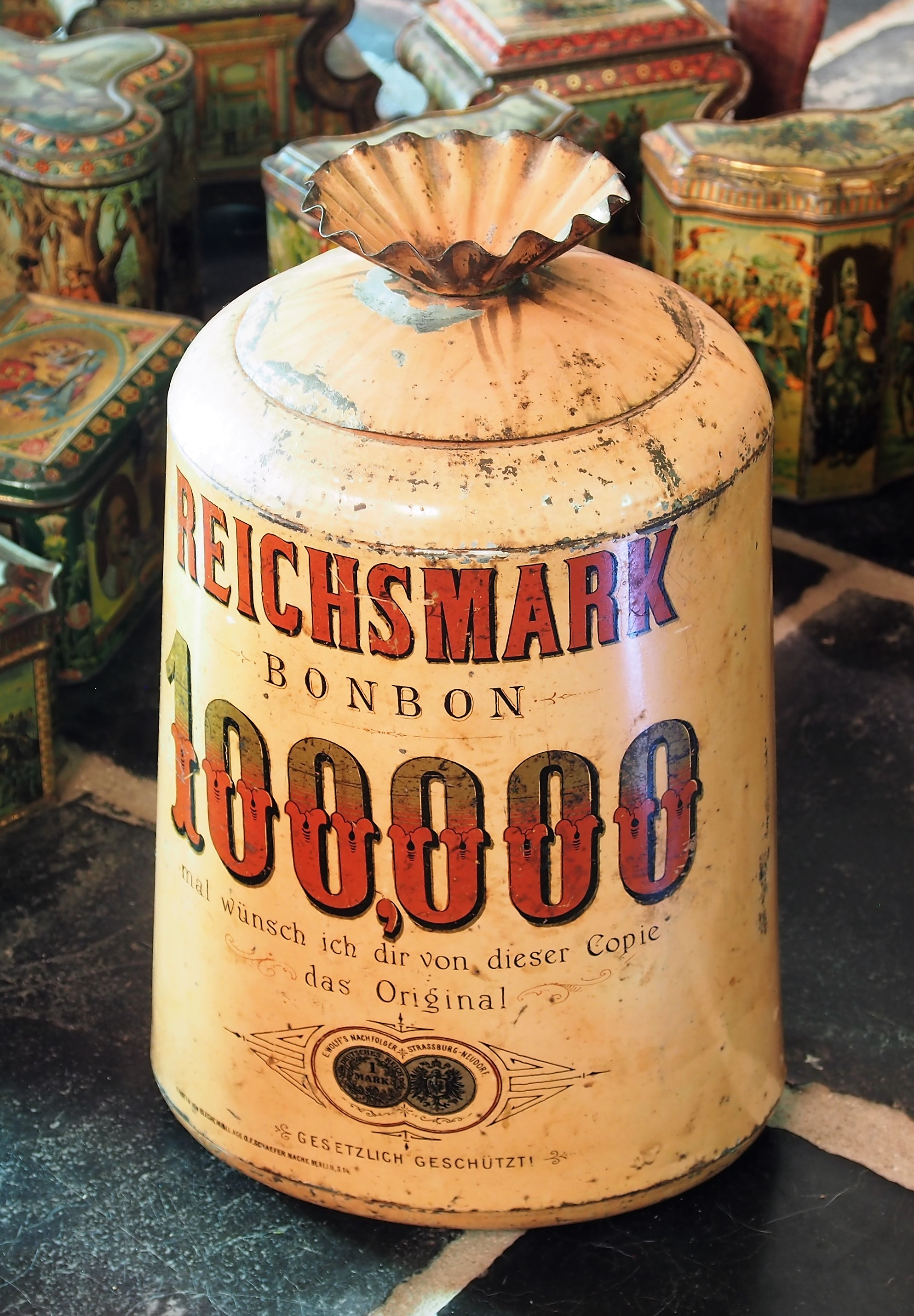
100000 Reichsmark Bonbon

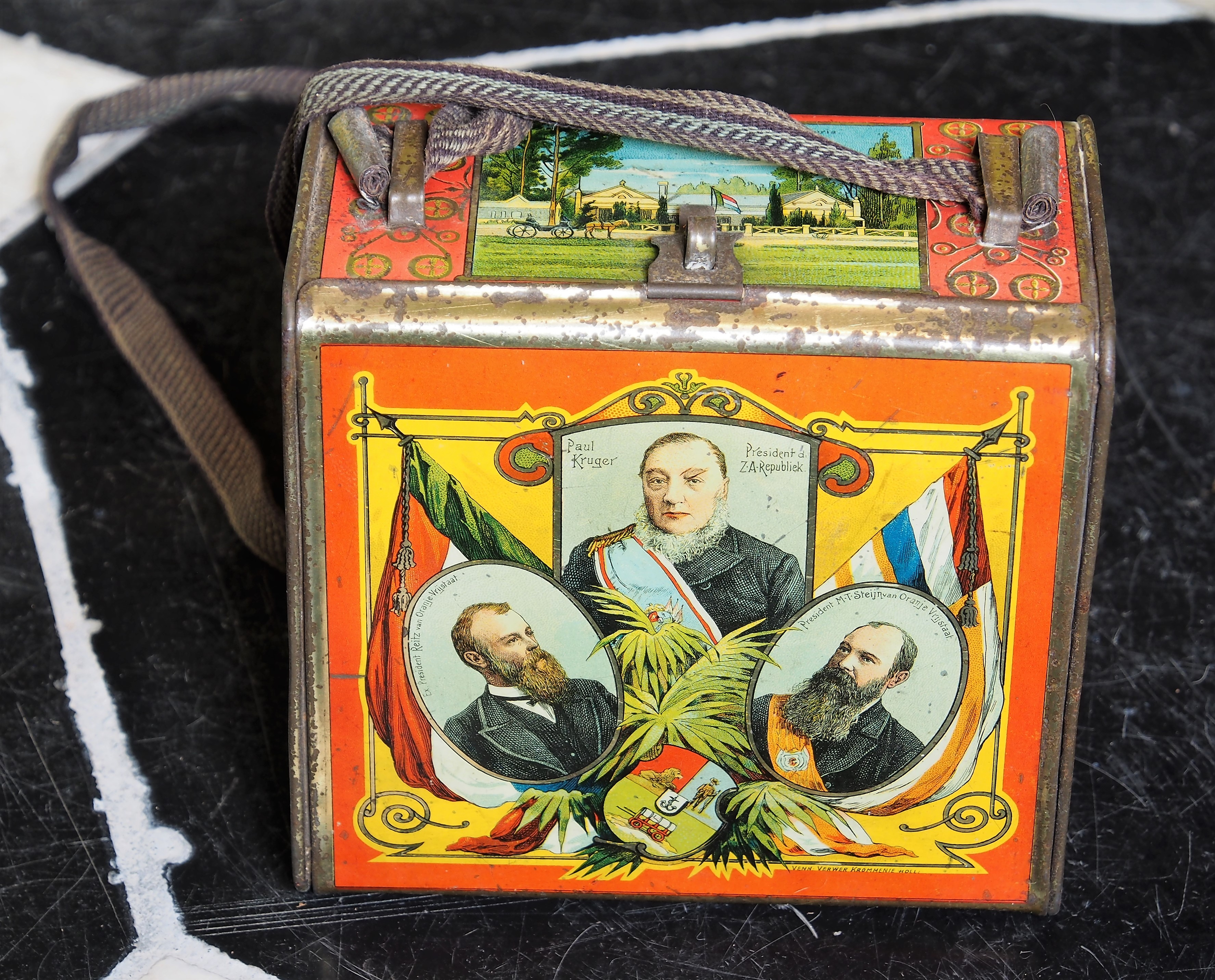
President Paul Kruger

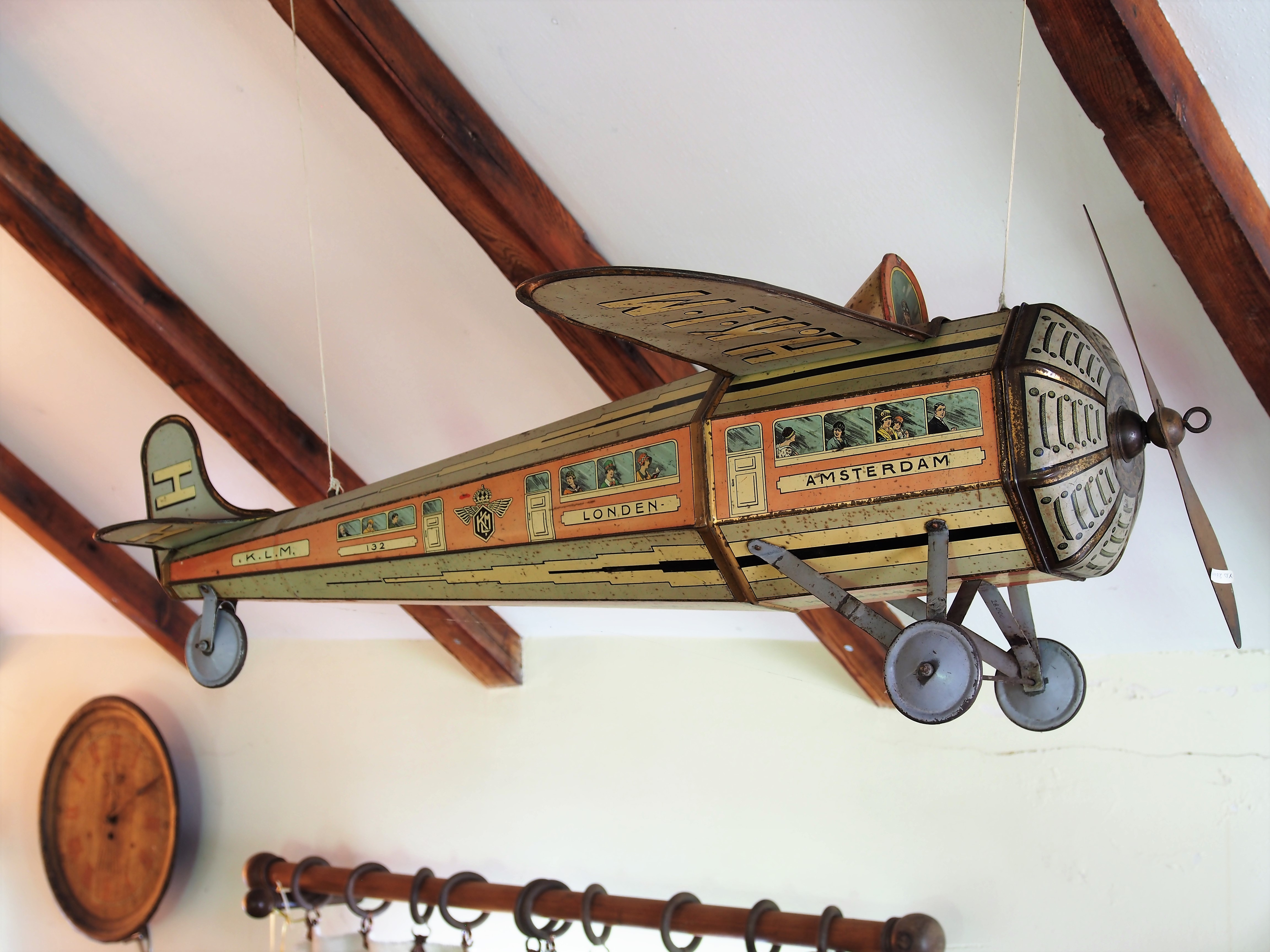
KLM airplane

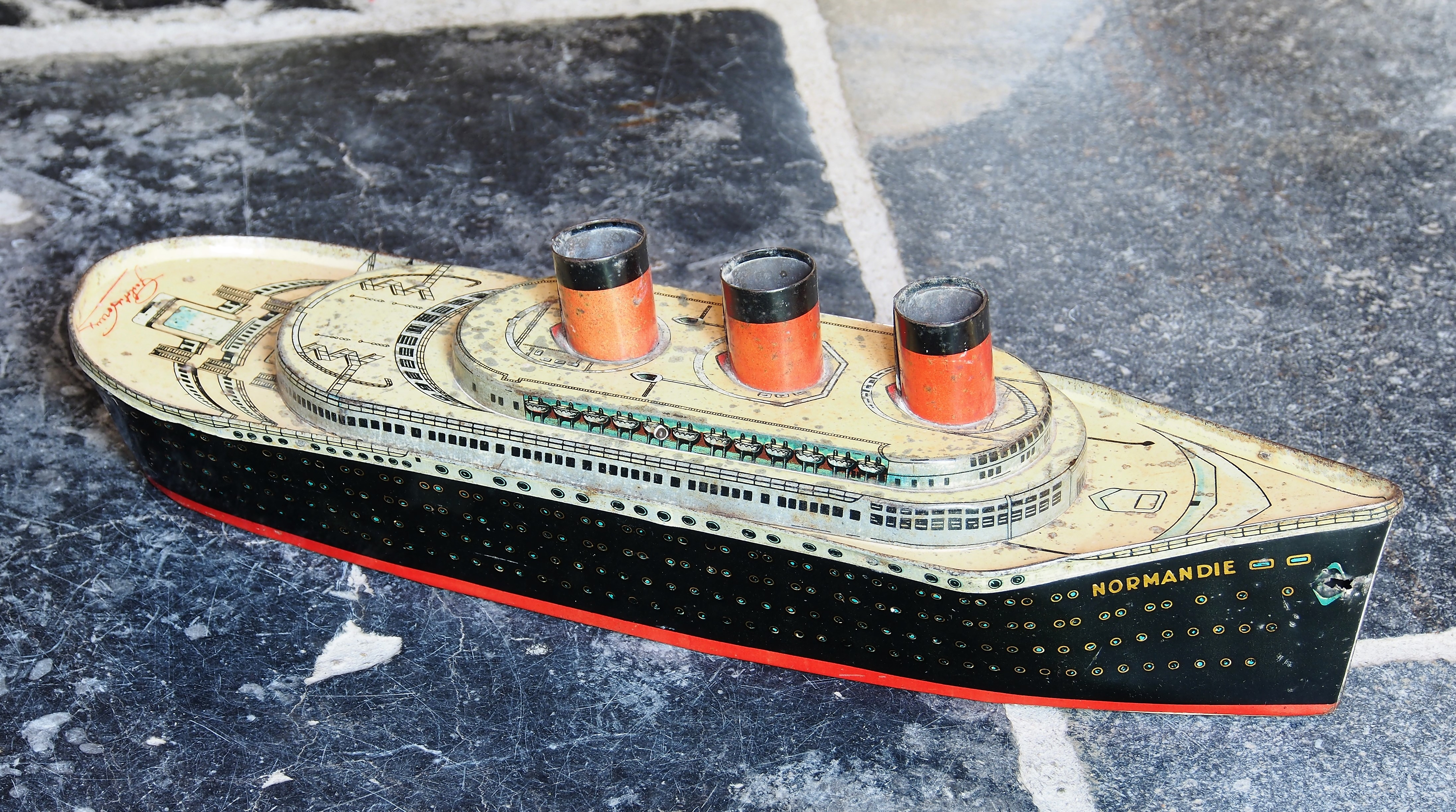
Normandie

== Sources ==
- "Yvette Dardenne : les boîtes, c'est son affaire - Toute l'actu 24h/24 sur Lavenir.net". lavenir.net.
