= Boëlhe =

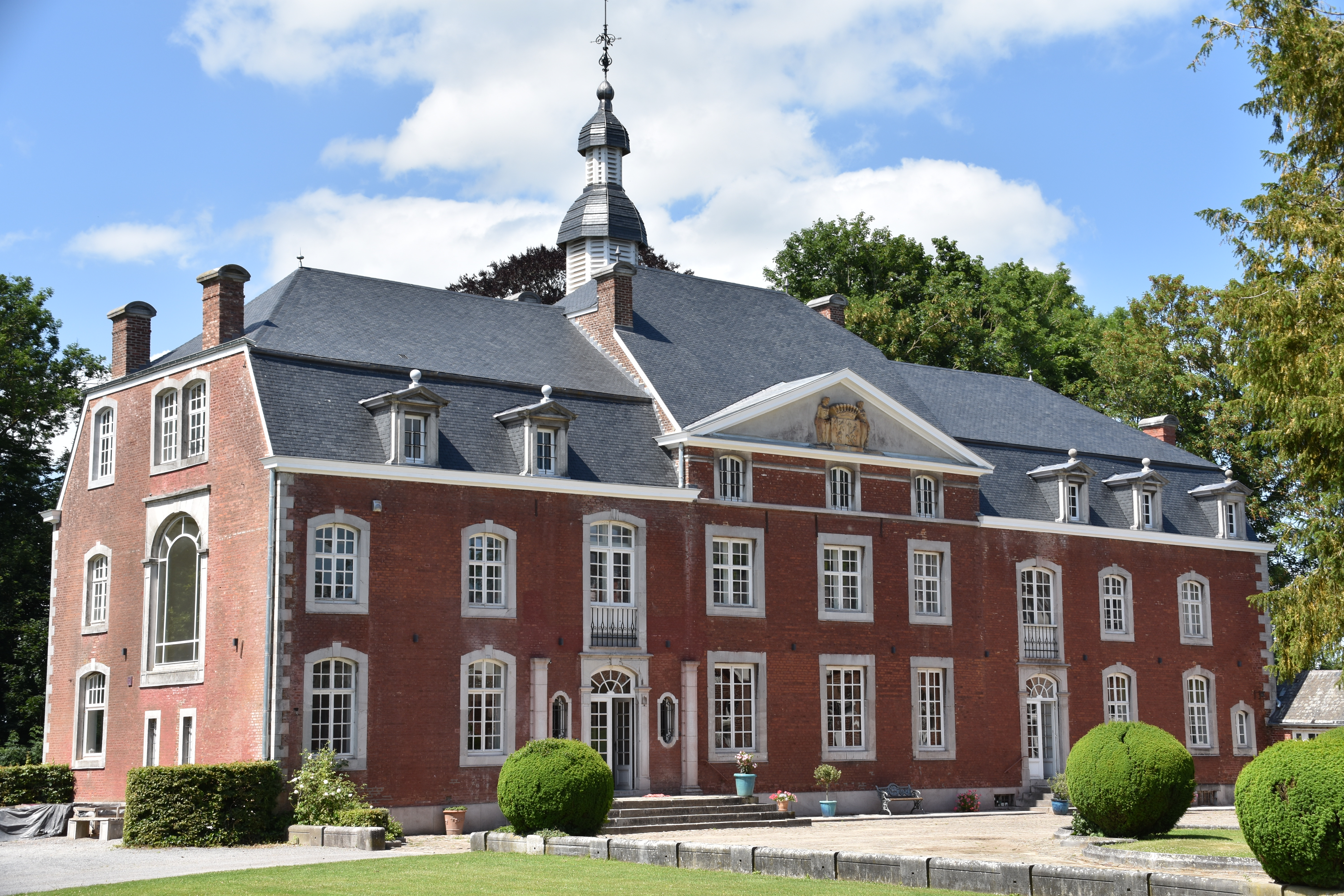
- Boëlhe, the château

- Location within Belgium Location within Europe
- Coordinates: 50°40′55″N 05°10′00″E
- Country: Belgium
- Region: Wallonia
- Province: Liège
- Municipality: Geer

Boëlhe (French pronunciation: [bwal]) is a village and district of the municipality of Geer, located in the province of Liège in Wallonia, Belgium.

The village was a fief subservient to the Prince-Bishopric of Liège during the Middle Ages. The village is centred around the château, surrounded by a park and rebuilt into ints present appearance around 1890. During the two World Wars, the château has been occupied in total seven times: five times by the German, once by the French and once by the American armed forces. The village church dates from 1764. The village also contains several other historical buildings from the 17th and 18th centuries.
