= List of protected heritage sites in Fexhe-le-Haut-Clocher =

This table shows an overview of the protected heritage sites in the Walloon town Fexhe-le-Haut-Clocher. This list is part of Belgium's national heritage.

Object	Year/architect	Town/section	Address	Coordinates	Number^{?}	Image
Tumulus of Noville ^{(nl)} ^{(fr)}		Noville		50.666967°N 5.380845°E	64025-CLT-0001-01 Info	Tumulus van Noville, ensemble van de tumulus en het perceel waar het op staat
Church of Saint-Jean Baptiste ^{(nl)} ^{(fr)}		Roloux		50.649370°N 5.395420°E	64025-CLT-0002-01 Info	Kerk Saint-Jean Baptiste: romaans koor, schip en toren
Old house Maison Dachet ^{(nl)} ^{(fr)}		Voroux-Goreux	Grand-Route n°22	50.654291°N 5.428786°E	64025-CLT-0003-01 Info	Huis, voorgevel en daken
Tumulus van Noville archeological site ^{(nl)} ^{(fr)}		Noville		50.666967°N 5.380845°E	64025-PEX-0001-01 Info	Tumulus van Noville, de archeologische site

== See also ==
- List of protected heritage sites in Liège (province)
- Fexhe-le-Haut-Clocher
