= Fexhe-le-Haut-Clocher =

Municipality in Liège Province, Wallonia, Belgium

Fexhe-le-Haut-Clocher Fexhe-å-Hôt-Clokî (Walloon)
- Municipality
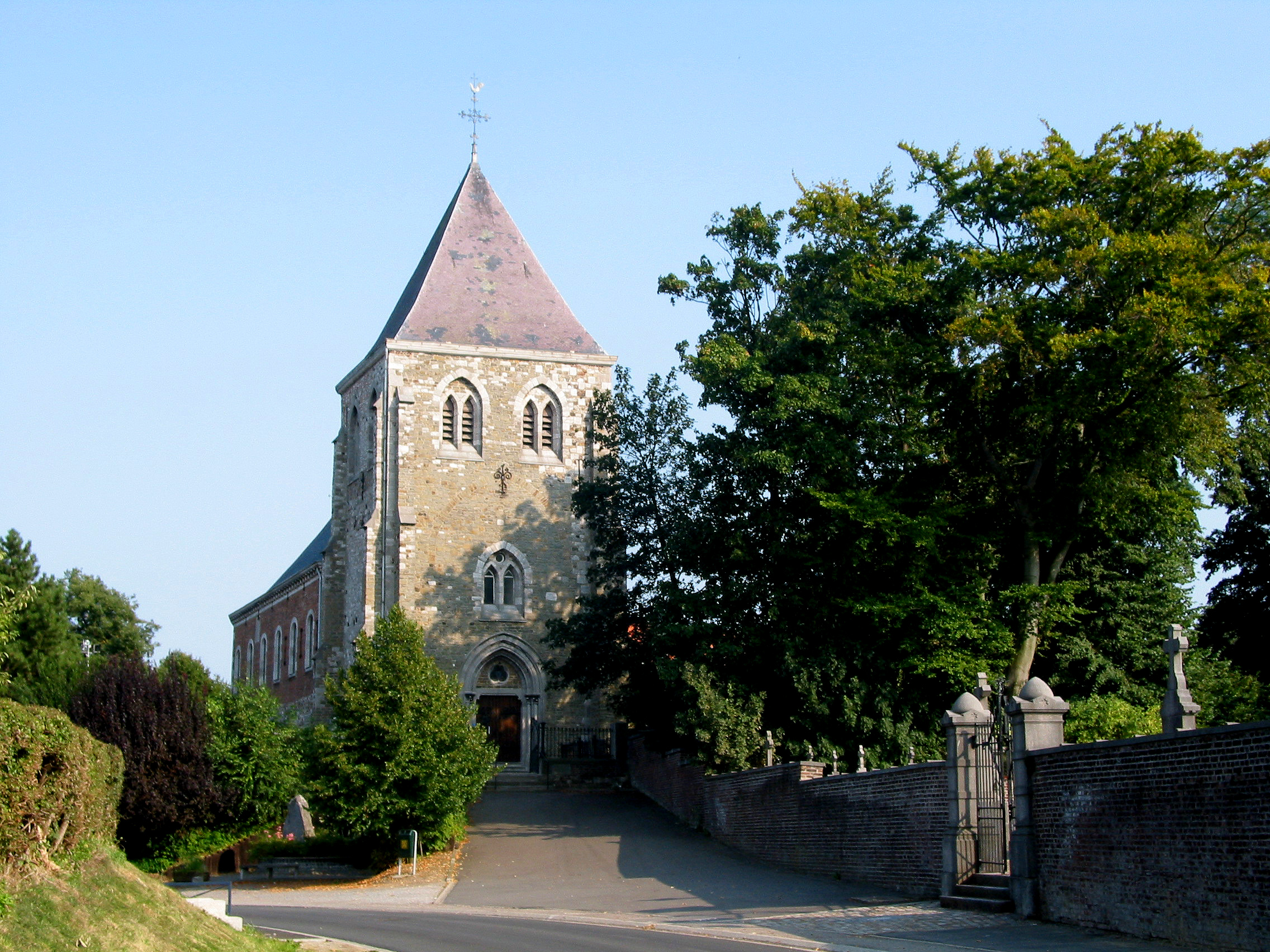

- Flag Coat of arms

- Location of Fexhe-le-Haut-Clocher in the province of Liège
- Interactive map of Fexhe-le-Haut-Clocher
- Location in Belgium
- Coordinates: 50°40′N 05°24′E
- Country: Belgium
- Community: French Community
- Region: Wallonia
- Province: Liège
- Arrondissement: Waremme

Government
  - Mayor: Henri Christophe
  - Governing party: Liste Mayeur

Area
  - Total: 19.45 km^{2} (7.51 sq mi)

Population (2018-01-01)
  - Total: 3,263
  - Density: 167.8/km^{2} (434.5/sq mi)
- Postal codes: 4347
- NIS code: 64025
- Area codes: 04
- Website: www.fexhe-le-haut-clocher.be

Fexhe-le-Haut-Clocher (French pronunciation: [fɛks lə o klɔʃe]; Walloon: Fexhe-å-Hôt-Clokî) is a municipality of Wallonia located in the province of Liège, Belgium.

On January 1, 2006, Fexhe-le-Haut-Clocher had a total population of 3,019. The total area is 19.25 km^{2} which gives a population density of 157 inhabitants per km^{2}.

The municipality consists of the following districts: Fexhe-le-Haut-Clocher, Freloux, Noville, Roloux, and Voroux-Goreux.

== See also ==
- List of protected heritage sites in Fexhe-le-Haut-Clocher
