= List of protected heritage sites in Hannut =

This table shows an overview of the protected heritage sites in the Walloon town Hannut. This list is part of Belgium's national heritage.

Object	Year/architect	Town/section	Address	Coordinates	Number^{?}	Image
Choir and tower of the church of Saint-Christophe ^{(nl)} ^{(fr)}		Hannuit	Hannut	50.671001°N 5.078007°E	64034-CLT-0003-01 Info	Koor en toren van de kerk Saint-Christophe
Tumulus of Avernas ^{(nl)} ^{(fr)}		Hannuit	Hannut	50.701350°N 5.071273°E	64034-CLT-0004-01 Info	Tumulus van Avernas en het ensemble dat wordt gevormd door deze tumulus met zijn omgeving
Castle à Trognée and its surroundings ^{(nl)} ^{(fr)}		Hannuit	Trognée	50.688700°N 5.123563°E	64034-CLT-0005-01 Info	
Chapel of Saint-Donat Blehen and the hill on which the building stands, and the nearby burial mound ^{(nl)} ^{(fr)}		Hannuit		50.668194°N 5.130275°E	64034-CLT-0006-01 Info	Kapel Saint-Donat de Blehen en de heuvel waarop het gebouw staat, en de nabijgelegen grafheuvel
Church Notre-Dame de l'Assomption ^{(nl)} ^{(fr)}		Hannuit		50.694753°N 5.078869°E	64034-CLT-0007-01 Info	Kerk Notre-Dame de l'Assomption
Towers dotted along the wall around the property of Saint-Hubert and the wall with which they are linked ^{(nl)} ^{(fr)}		Hannuit	Merdorp	50.650840°N 4.994974°E	64034-CLT-0008-01 Info	
Moxhe castle and its surrounding area ^{(nl)} ^{(fr)}		Hannuit		50.629392°N 5.078900°E	64034-CLT-0009-01 Info	
Area bordering Moxhe castle ^{(nl)} ^{(fr)}		Hannuit		50.627852°N 5.078473°E	64034-CLT-0010-01 Info	
Tower of the church Saint-Martin ^{(nl)} ^{(fr)}		Hannuit	Thisnes	50.665322°N 5.048099°E	64034-CLT-0011-01 Info	Toren van de kerk Saint-Martin
Church of Thisnes and (some of) its surroundings ^{(nl)} ^{(fr)}		Hannuit		50.665694°N 5.047061°E	64034-CLT-0012-01 Info	
Tumulus "Tombe de l'Empereur" ^{(nl)} ^{(fr)}		Hannuit		50.638174°N 5.085267°E	64034-CLT-0013-01 Info	Tombe de l'Empereur en het ensemble wat wordt gevormd door de tumulus en een deel van het perceel waarop de tumulus gelegen is
Two wooded lanes and surroundings ^{(nl)} ^{(fr)}		Hannuit	Hannut	50.701266°N 5.117782°E	64034-CLT-0014-01 Info	
Ramparts of Saint-Christophe ^{(nl)} ^{(fr)}		Hannuit	rue de l'Aite	50.670521°N 5.075755°E	64034-CLT-0015-01 Info	Petit Bosquet aan de rue de l'Aite en de wallen van Saint-Christophe
Chapel Notre Dame de Bon Secours ^{(nl)} ^{(fr)}		Hannuit	Hannut	50.653180°N 5.094225°E	64034-CLT-0016-01 Info	
Lens-Saint-Rémy priory, the square, the wooded lane, the church and the rectory ^{(nl)} ^{(fr)}		Hannuit	Lens-Saint-Rémy	50.655864°N 5.130317°E	64034-CLT-0017-01 Info	
Organs of the church of Lens-Saint-Rémy ^{(nl)} ^{(fr)}		Hannuit		50.654682°N 5.133412°E	64034-CLT-0019-01 Info	
The boulder "Pierre Motet", situated at the foot of the "Tiège de Velupon" ^{(nl)} ^{(fr)}		Hannuit	Lens-Saint-Remy	50.650809°N 5.131738°E	64034-CLT-0020-01 Info	De "Pierre Motet", gelegen aan de voet van de "Tiège de Velupon"
Tumulus: 2 tumuli in the "Bois des Tombes" ^{(nl)} ^{(fr)}		Hannuit	Hannut	50.638297°N 4.996685°E	64034-CLT-0021-01 Info	Tumuli van het Bois des Tombes, het ensemble van twee tumuli en omgeving
church Notre-Dame de l'Assomption and surroundings ^{(nl)} ^{(fr)}		Hannuit	Avernas-le -Baudouin	50.694730°N 5.078526°E	64034-CLT-0023-01 Info	
Wells ^{(nl)} ^{(fr)}		Hannuit	Rue du Curé 2, Moxhe	50.630189°N 5.081861°E	64034-CLT-0024-01 Info	
Tumulus archeological site, called locally "A la tombe" ^{(nl)} ^{(fr)}		Hannuit		50.701350°N 5.071273°E	64034-PEX-0001-01 Info	Tumulus van Avernas, de archeologische site, ter plaatse genaamd "A la tombe"
Tumulus archeological site, called locally "La tombe de Blehen" ^{(nl)} ^{(fr)}		Hannuit		50.668948°N 5.129521°E	64034-PEX-0002-01 Info	Tumulus van Blehen, de archeologische site, ter plaatse genaamd "La tombe de Blehen"
Tumulus archeological site, called locally "Tombe de l'Empereur" ^{(nl)} ^{(fr)}		Hannuit		50.638174°N 5.085267°E	64034-PEX-0003-01 Info	Tombe de l'Empereur, de archeologische site
Tumulus archeological site, called locally "Bois des Tombes" ^{(nl)} ^{(fr)}		Hannuit		50.638297°N 4.996685°E	64034-PEX-0004-01 Info	Tumuli van het Bois des Tombes (Hannuit), de archeologische site van 2 tumuli

== See also ==
- List of protected heritage sites in Liège (province)
- Hannut
