= Saint-Georges-sur-Meuse =

Municipality in Liège Province, Wallonia, Belgium

Saint-Georges-sur-Meuse Sint-Djôr-so-Mouze (Walloon)
- Municipality
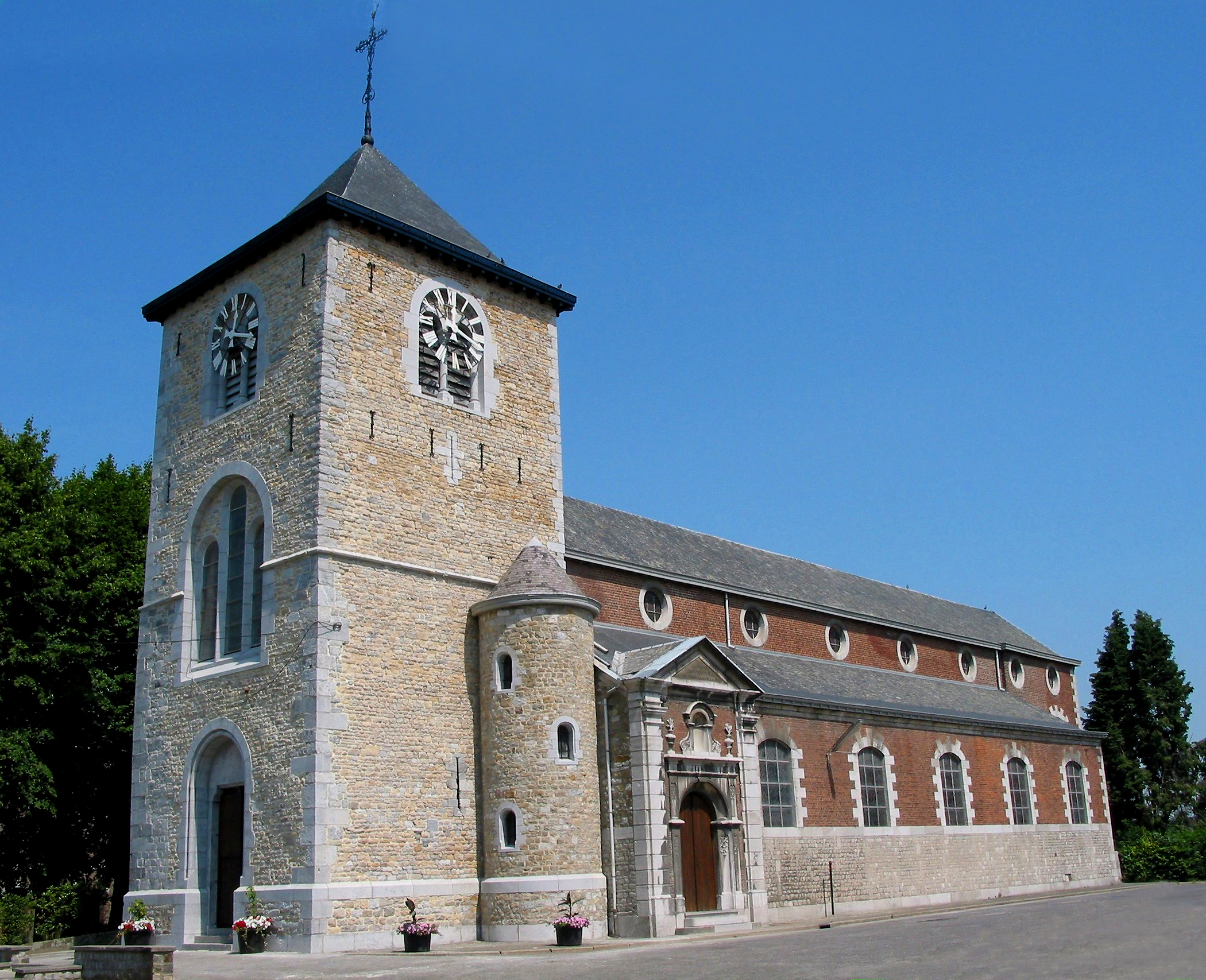

- Location of Saint-Georges-sur-Meuse in the province of Liège
- Interactive map of Saint-Georges-sur-Meuse
- Location in Belgium
- Coordinates: 50°36′N 05°21′E
- Country: Belgium
- Community: French Community
- Region: Wallonia
- Province: Liège
- Arrondissement: Waremme

Government
  - Mayor: Francis Dejon
  - Governing party: ENSEMBLE

Area
  - Total: 20.93 km^{2} (8.08 sq mi)

Population (2018-01-01)
  - Total: 6,784
  - Density: 324.1/km^{2} (839.5/sq mi)
- Postal codes: 4470
- NIS code: 64065
- Area codes: 04
- Website: www.saint-georges-sur-meuse.be

Saint-Georges-sur-Meuse (French pronunciation: [sɛ̃ ʒɔʁʒ syʁ møz], literally Saint-Georges on Meuse; Walloon: Sint-Djôr-so-Mouze) is a municipality of Wallonia located in the province of Liège, Belgium.

On January 1, 2006, Saint-Georges-sur-Meuse had a total population of 6,613. The total area is 20.90 km^{2} which gives a population density of 316 inhabitants per km^{2}.

The municipality also includes the following population centres: Dommartin, la Mallieue, Saint-Georges-sur-Meuse, Stockay, Sur-les-Bois, Tincelle, Warfée, Warfusée, and Yernawe.

== See also ==
- List of protected heritage sites in Saint-Georges-sur-Meuse
