= Oreye =

Municipality in Liège Province, Wallonia, Belgium

Oreye Oreye (Walloon): Oerle (Dutch)
- Municipality
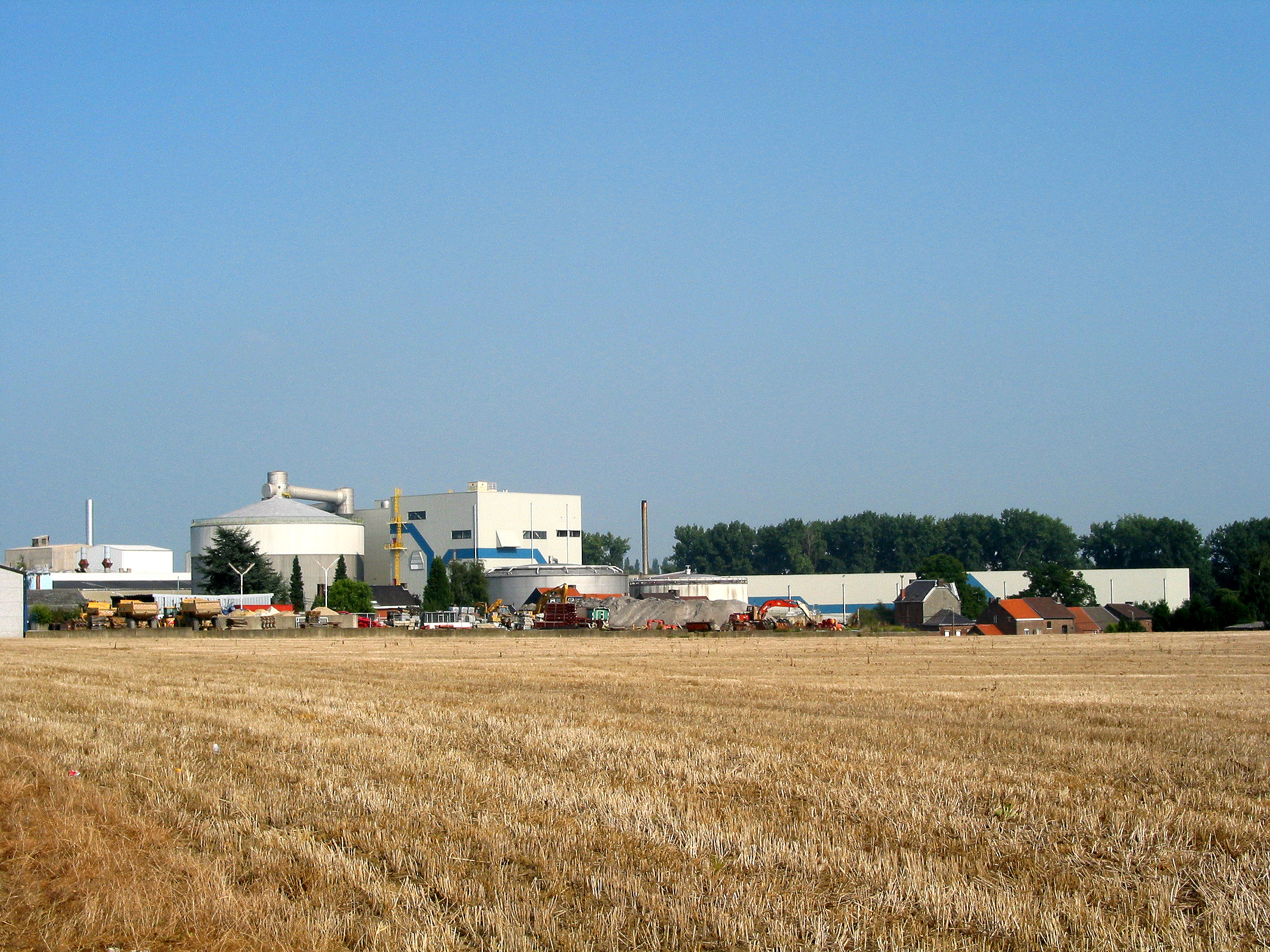

- Location of Oreye in the province of Liège
- Interactive map of Oreye
- Location in Belgium
- Coordinates: 50°44′N 05°22′E
- Country: Belgium
- Community: French Community
- Region: Wallonia
- Province: Liège
- Arrondissement: Waremme

Government
  - Mayor: Jean-Marc Daerden (Ensemble)
  - Governing party: Ensemble

Area
  - Total: 19.5 km^{2} (7.5 sq mi)

Population (2018-01-01)
  - Total: 3,912
  - Density: 201/km^{2} (520/sq mi)
- Postal codes: 4360
- NIS code: 64056
- Area codes: 019
- Website: www.oreye.be

Oreye (French: [ɔʁɛj]; Dutch: Oerle [ˈuːrlə]) is a municipality of Wallonia located in the province of Liège, Belgium.

On January 1, 2018, Oreye had a total population of 3,912. The total area is 19.64 km^{2} which gives a population density of 199 inhabitants per km^{2}.

The municipality consists of the following districts: Bergilers, Grandville, Lens-sur-Geer, Oreye, and Otrange.

== See also ==
- List of protected heritage sites in Oreye
