= Remicourt, Belgium =

Municipality in Liège Province, Wallonia, Belgium

Remicourt Remicoû (Walloon)
- Municipality
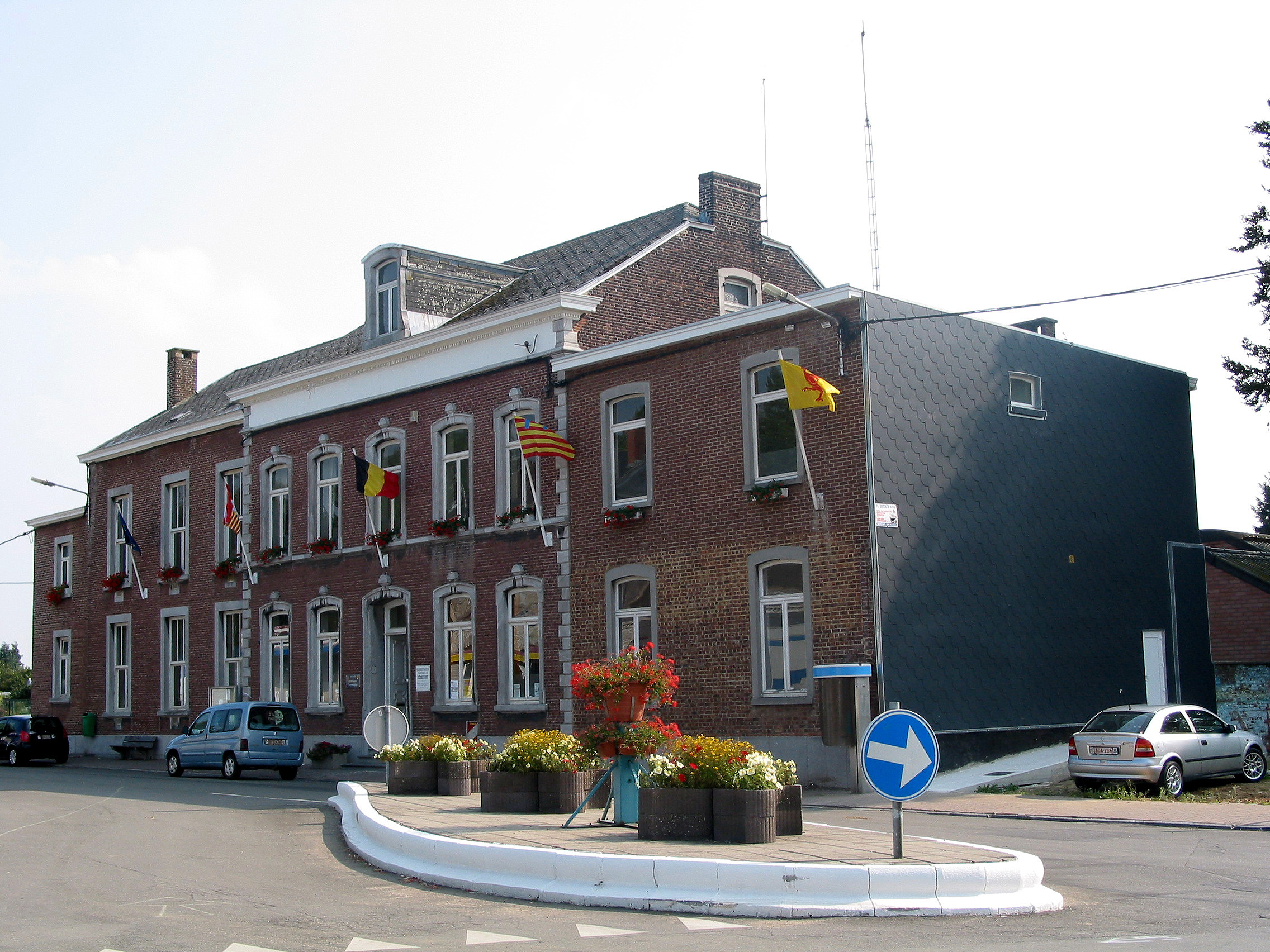
- Remicourt town hall

- Flag Coat of arms

- Location of Remicourt in the province of Liège
- Interactive map of Remicourt
- Location in Belgium
- Coordinates: 50°41′N 05°20′E
- Country: Belgium
- Community: French Community
- Region: Wallonia
- Province: Liège
- Arrondissement: Waremme

Government
  - Mayor: Thierry Missaire
  - Governing party: R-Renouveau - Pour Remicourt Solidaire

Area
  - Total: 22.83 km^{2} (8.81 sq mi)

Population (2018-01-01)
  - Total: 5,904
  - Density: 258.6/km^{2} (669.8/sq mi)
- Postal codes: 4350, 4351
- NIS code: 64063
- Area codes: 019
- Website: www.remicourt.be

Remicourt (French pronunciation: [ʁəmikuʁ]; Walloon: Remicoû) is a municipality of Wallonia located in the province of Liège, Belgium.

On January 1, 2006, Remicourt had a total population of 5,012. The total area is 22.58 km^{2} which gives a population density of 222 inhabitants per km^{2}.

The municipality consists of the following districts: Hodeige, Lamine, Momalle, Pousset, and Remicourt.

== See also ==
- List of protected heritage sites in Remicourt, Belgium
