= Berloz =

Municipality in Liège Province, Wallonia, Belgium

Berloz Bierlô (Walloon): Berlo (Dutch)
- Municipality
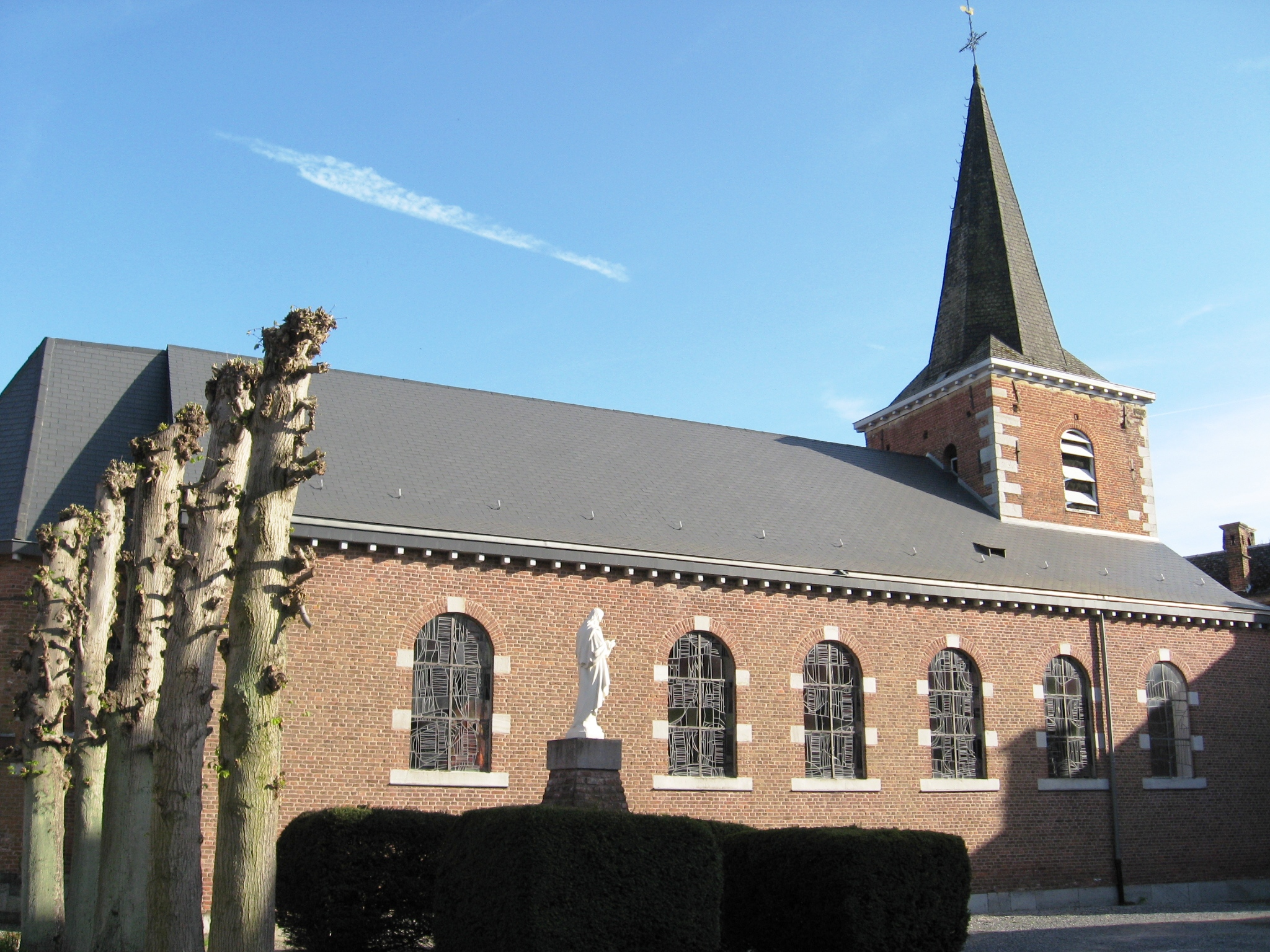

- Flag Coat of arms

- Location of Berloz in the province of Liège
- Interactive map of Berloz
- Location in Belgium
- Coordinates: 50°42′N 05°13′E
- Country: Belgium
- Community: French Community
- Region: Wallonia
- Province: Liège
- Arrondissement: Waremme

Government
  - Mayor: Béatrice Moureau
  - Governing party: IC

Area
  - Total: 14.51 km^{2} (5.60 sq mi)

Population (2018-01-01)
  - Total: 3,080
  - Density: 212/km^{2} (550/sq mi)
- Postal codes: 4257
- NIS code: 64008
- Area codes: 019
- Website: www.berloz.be

Berloz (French pronunciation: [bɛʁlo]; Walloon: Bierlô) is a municipality of Wallonia located in the province of Liège, Belgium.

On January 1, 2006, Berloz had a total population of 2,781. The total area is 14.49 km^{2} which gives a population density of 192 inhabitants per km^{2}.

The municipality consists of the following districts: Berloz, Corswarem, and Rosoux-Crenwick.
