= Wasseiges =

Municipality in Liège Province, Wallonia, Belgium

Wasseiges Wazedje (Walloon)
- Municipality
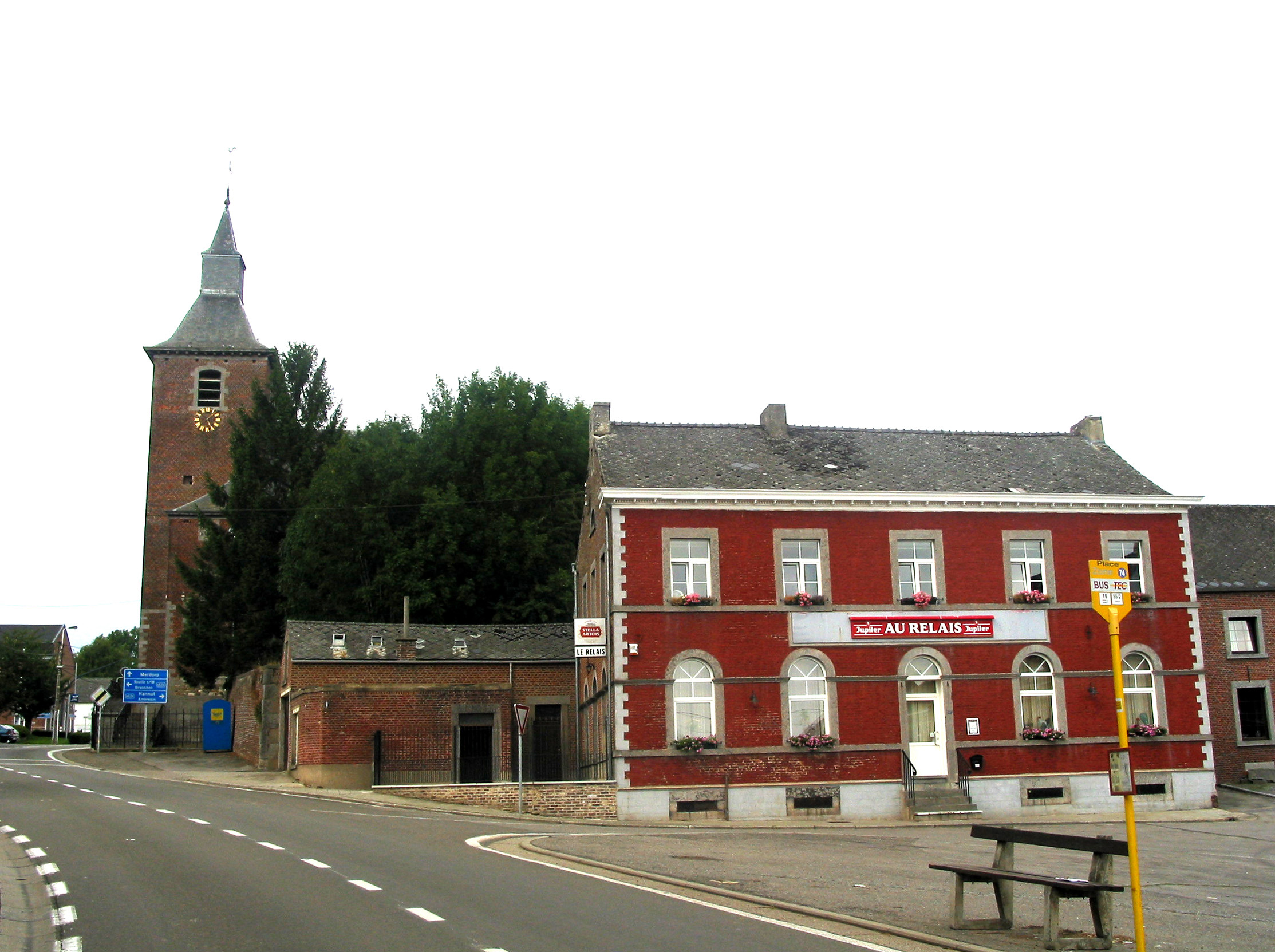

- Coat of arms

- Location of Wasseiges in the province of Liège
- Interactive map of Wasseiges
- Location in Belgium
- Coordinates: 50°37′N 05°00′E
- Country: Belgium
- Community: French Community
- Region: Wallonia
- Province: Liège
- Arrondissement: Waremme

Government
  - Mayor: Thomas Courtois
  - Governing party: UC

Area
  - Total: 24.48 km^{2} (9.45 sq mi)

Population (2018-01-01)
  - Total: 2,962
  - Density: 121.0/km^{2} (313.4/sq mi)
- Postal codes: 4219
- NIS code: 64075
- Area codes: 081
- Website: www.wasseiges.be

Wasseiges (French pronunciation: [wasɛʒ]; Walloon: Wazedje) is a municipality of Wallonia located in the province of Liège, Belgium.

On January 1, 2006, Wasseiges had a total population of 2,517. The total area is 24.45 km^{2} which gives a population density of 103 inhabitants per km^{2}.

The municipality consists of the following districts: Acosse, Ambresin, Meeffe, and Wasseiges.

== See also ==
- List of protected heritage sites in Wasseiges
