= Roannay =

Coordinates: 50.455°N 5.94047°E

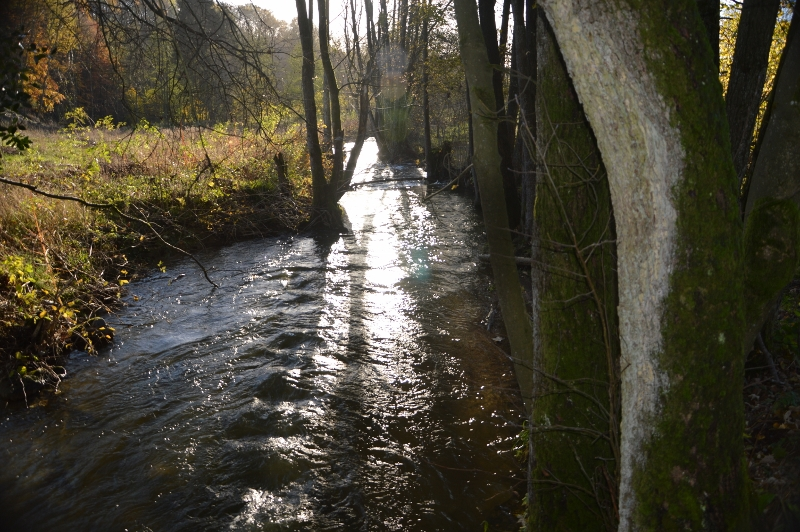

Location
- Country: Belgium

Physical characteristics
- Source
  - location: Liège Province

Roannay is a river in Belgium. It flows for 11 kilometres (7 mi) through the province of Liège in the northern-central part of the country.
