= List of protected heritage sites in Oreye =

This table shows an overview of the protected heritage sites in the Walloon town Oreye. This list is part of Belgium's national heritage.

| Object | Year/architect | Town/section | Address | Coordinates | Number^{?} | Image |
|---|---|---|---|---|---|---|
| St. Clement's Church with tower ^{(nl)} ^{(fr)} | | Oreye Oreye | | 50.728418°N 5.356871°E | 64056-CLT-0001-01 Info | Kerk Saint-Clément: toren en schip |
| Tumulus Otrange and the chapel of Saint-Eloy with surroundings ^{(nl)} ^{(fr)} | | Oreye Otrange | | 50.737317°N 5.368178°E | 64056-CLT-0002-01 Info | Tumulus van Otrange en het ensemble van de tumulus, de kapel van Saint-Eloy en de directe omgeving |
| Church of Saint-Hubert ^{(nl)} ^{(fr)} | | Oreye Lens-sur-Geer | | 50.721350°N 5.353065°E | 64056-CLT-0003-01 Info | Kerk Saint-Hubert: toren en schip |
| Hodeige tumulus and surroundings ^{(nl)} ^{(fr)} | | Oreye Lens-sur-Geer | | 50.700393°N 5.364422°E | 64056-CLT-0004-01 Info | Tumulus van Hodeige en omgeving |
| Hodeige tumulus, the archaeological site ^{(nl)} ^{(fr)} | | Oreye Lens-sur-Geer | | 50.700393°N 5.364422°E | 64056-PEX-0001-01 Info | Tumulus van Hodeige, de archeologische site |

== See also ==
- List of protected heritage sites in Liège (province)
- Oreye
