= List of protected heritage sites in Saint-Georges-sur-Meuse =

This table shows an overview of the protected heritage sites in the Walloon town Saint-Georges-sur-Meuse. This list is part of Belgium's national heritage.

Object	Year/architect	Town/section	Address	Coordinates	Number^{?}	Image
Yernawe tumulus and surroundings ^{(nl)} ^{(fr)}		Saint-Georges-sur-Meuse	rue du Tumulus	50.594708°N 5.340086°E	64065-CLT-0001-01 Info	Tumulus van Yernawe en omgeving
Castle Warfusée and its surroundings, excepting the Orangerie ^{(nl)} ^{(fr)}		Saint-Georges-sur-Meuse	rue de Warfusée, n°113 (M)	50.585217°N 5.370535°E	64065-CLT-0002-01 Info	Kasteel van Warfusée en bijgebouwen, behalve de oranjerie
Building "l'Union": facades, roof and auditorium ^{(nl)} ^{(fr)}		Saint-Georges-sur-Meuse	rue Reine Astrid, n°69	50.582460°N 5.357796°E	64065-CLT-0004-01 Info	Gevels, daken en het auditorium van het gebouw "de Unie" ("l'Union")
Yernawe tumulus, the archaeological site ^{(nl)} ^{(fr)}		Saint-Georges-sur-Meuse		50.594708°N 5.340086°E	64065-PEX-0001-01 Info	Tumulus van Yernawe, archeologische site
Castle Warfusée and its surroundings, including the Orangerie and its surroundings ^{(nl)} ^{(fr)}		Saint-Georges-sur-Meuse		50.585217°N 5.370535°E	64065-PEX-0002-01 Info	Kasteel van Warfusée en de bijgebouwen en het ensemble gevormd door het kasteel, de bijgebouwen, de oranjerie en het omliggende land

== See also ==
- List of protected heritage sites in Liège (province)
- Saint-Georges-sur-Meuse
