= List of protected heritage sites in Wasseiges =

This article gives information on the five protected heritage sites in Wasseiges, Belgium. These are also part of Belgian National Heritage. The below table gives information on the site, Town, Coordinates, Number and an image (if available).

Object	Year/architect	Town/section	Address	Coordinates	Number^{?}	Image
Tumuli du Soleil, two burial mounds and the ensemble formed by these hills and the land on which they are located, Roman road ^{(nl)} ^{(fr)}		Wasseiges		50.636059°N 5.033761°E	64075-CLT-0001-01 Info	Tumuli du Soleil, twee grafheuvels en het ensemble gevormd door deze heuveltjes en het perceel waarop zij zich bevinden, Romeinse weg
Marshes and ponds, ancient manufacture of sugar, to Wasseiges ^{(nl)} ^{(fr)}		Wasseiges		50.619871°N 5.021098°E	64075-CLT-0002-01 Info	
The votive stone located on the rue du Soleil Ambresin and the ensemble formed by the monument and the four linden trees that surround ^{(nl)} ^{(fr)}		Wasseiges		50.635881°N 5.039668°E	64075-CLT-0003-01 Info	De votiefsteen gelegen aan de rue du Soleil te Ambresin en het ensemble gevormd door het monument en de vier linden die het omringen
The total of the organs in the Saint Martin's in Wasseiges ^{(nl)} ^{(fr)}		Wasseiges		50.622129°N 5.005884°E	64075-CLT-0004-01 Info	
Tumuli du Soleil, an archaeological site with two tumuli ^{(nl)} ^{(fr)}		Wasseiges		50.636059°N 5.033761°E	64075-PEX-0001-01 Info	Tumuli du Soleil, een archeologische site met twee tumuli

== See also ==
- List of protected heritage sites in Liège (province)

== Sources ==
- Belgian heritage register: Direction générale opérationnelle - Aménagement du territoire, Logement, Patrimoine et Energie (DG4)
- www.dglive.be
