= List of protected heritage sites in Remicourt, Belgium =

This table shows an overview of the protected heritage sites in the Walloon town Remicourt, Belgium. This list is part of Belgium's national heritage.

Object	Year/architect	Town/section	Address	Coordinates	Number^{?}	Image
Church Saint-Andre, with the exception of the north aisle and sacristy ^{(nl)} ^{(fr)}		Remicourt		50.698379°N 5.340082°E	64063-CLT-0001-01 Info	Kerk Saint-André, met uitzondering van de noordelijke zijbeuk en de sacristie
Hodeige tumulus and surroundings ^{(nl)} ^{(fr)}		Remicourt		50.700393°N 5.364422°E	64063-CLT-0002-01 Info	Tumulus van Hodeige en omgeving
Church of Saint Hadelin: Tower ^{(nl)} ^{(fr)}		Remicourt	Lamine	50.690147°N 5.337850°E	64063-CLT-0003-01 Info	Kerk Saint-Hadelin: toren
Lamine tumulus and the land on which it is situated ^{(nl)} ^{(fr)}		Remicourt		50.689472°N 5.336131°E	64063-CLT-0004-01 Info	Tumulus van Lamine en het ensemble van de tumulus en het perceel waarop ze gelegen is
Church Notre-Dame de l'Assomption ^{(nl)} ^{(fr)}		Remicourt	Momalle	50.685663°N 5.373037°E	64063-CLT-0005-01 Info	Kerk Notre-Dame de l'Assomption
Chapel Notre-Dame de l'Arbre, and the three linden trees planted at the entrance to the sanctuary ^{(nl)} ^{(fr)}		Remicourt		50.682520°N 5.385982°E	64063-CLT-0006-01 Info	
Chapel Notre-Dame de l'Arbre and its surroundings ^{(nl)} ^{(fr)}		Remicourt		50.682462°N 5.385798°E	64063-CLT-0007-01 Info	
Noville tumulus, and the plot on which it stands ^{(nl)} ^{(fr)}		Remicourt		50.666967°N 5.380845°E	64063-CLT-0008-01 Info	Tumulus van Noville, het ensemble van de tumulus en het perceel waar het op ligt
Windmill ^{(nl)} ^{(fr)}		Remicourt	rue Haut Vinâve, n°72 (M) et alentours (S)	50.683116°N 5.388217°E	64063-CLT-0009-01 Info	
Tumulus Hodeige ^{(nl)} ^{(fr)}		Hodeige Remicourt		50.700393°N 5.364422°E	64063-PEX-0001-01 Info	Tumulus van Hodeige
Noville tumulus, the archaeological site ^{(nl)} ^{(fr)}		Remicourt		50.666967°N 5.380845°E	64063-PEX-0002-01 Info	Tumulus van Noville, de archeologische site

== See also ==
- List of protected heritage sites in Liège (province)
- Remicourt, Belgium
