= Arrondissement of Waremme =

Arrondissement in Wallonia, Belgium

Arrondissement of Waremme Arrondissement de Waremme
- Arrondissement
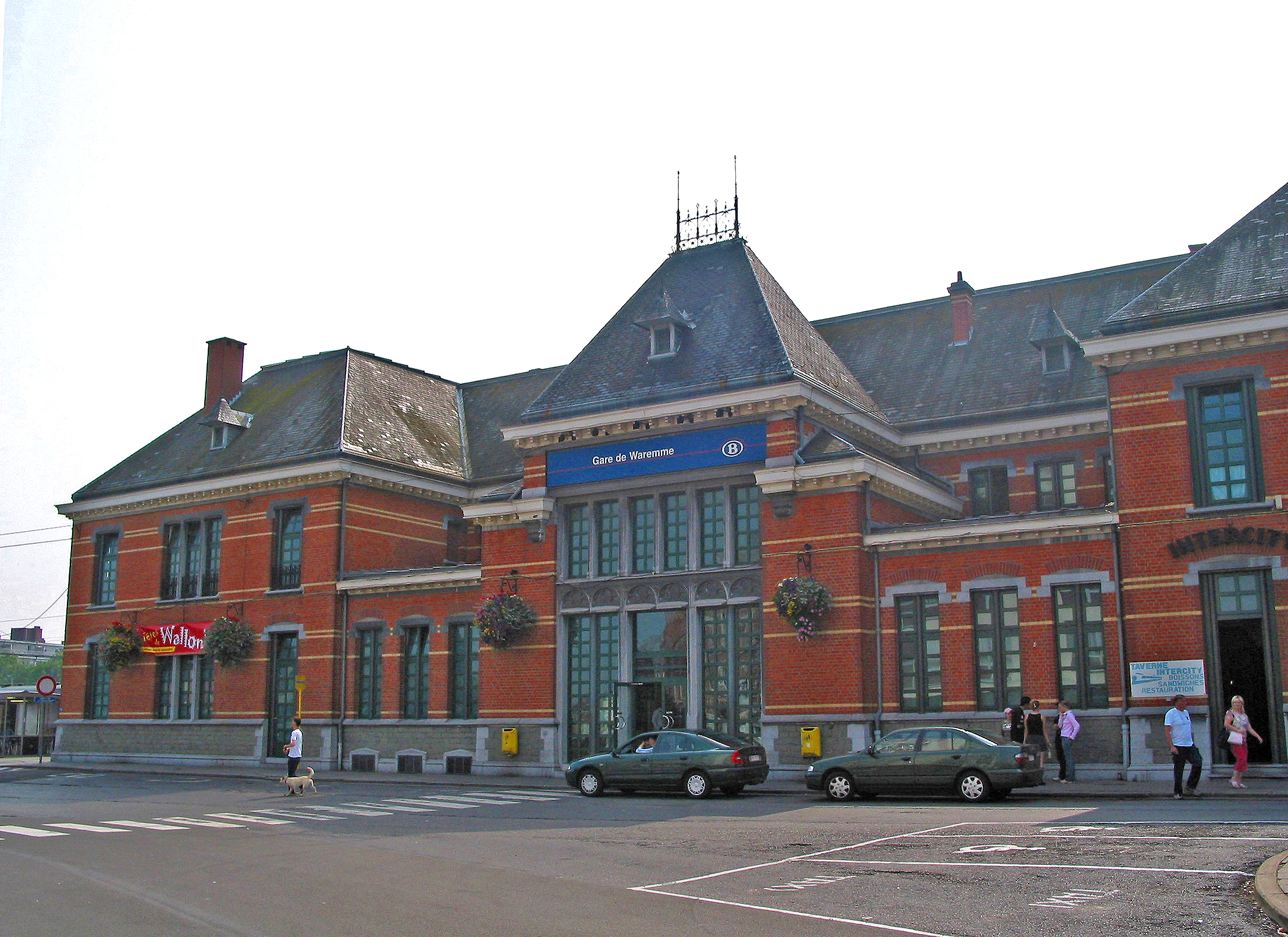
- Waremme Railway Station

- Location of the arrondissement in Liège
- Coordinates: 50.65°N 5.2°E
- Country: Belgium
- Region: Wallonia
- Province: Liège
- Municipalities: 14

Area
  - Total: 389.86 km^{2} (150.53 sq mi)

Population (1 January 2017)
  - Total: 80,181
  - Density: 205.67/km^{2} (532.67/sq mi)
- Time zone: UTC+1 (CET)
  - Summer (DST): UTC+2 (CEST)

The Arrondissement of Waremme (French: Arrondissement de Waremme; Dutch: Arrondissement Borgworm) is one of the four administrative arrondissements in the Walloon province of Liège, Belgium. Its size is 389.86 km^{2} (150.53 sq mi) and its population on 1 January 2015 was 78,851 people.

The Arrondissement is only an administrative one. Judicially its communes depend on the Arrondissement of Liège except for Braives, Hannut, Lincent, Saint-Georges-sur-Meuse, and Wasseiges who depend on Huy.

== History ==
The Waremme administrative district was created in 1821 by joining the cantons of Avennes and Landen (taken from Huy) and the canton of Waremme (taken from Liège).

During the final fixing of the linguistic border in 1963, the communes of Attenhoven, Eliksem, Laar, Landen, Neerhespen, Neerlanden, Neerwinden, Overhespen, Overwinden, Rumsdorp, Wamont, Walsbets, Houtain-l'Évêque, Wange, and Wezeren were assigned to the Arrondissement of Leuven. The commune of Corswarem and part of Montenaken were assigned to the Arrondissement of Hasselt, and the commune of Otrange to the Arrondissement of Tongeren.

In 1965, the communes of Roloux and Voroux-Goreux were transferred from the Arrondissement of Liège.

In 1971, the communes of Borlez and Les Waleffes were transferred from Huy.

In 1977, the commune of Aineffe was transferred from Huy and there were exchanges of territory with the Arrondissement of Liège.

The Administrative Arrondissement of Waremme consists of the following communes and sections:

=== Communes ===
- Berloz
- Braives
- Crisnée
- Donceel
- Faimes
- Fexhe-le-Haut-Clocher
- Geer
- Hannut
- Lincent
- Oreye
- Remicourt
- Saint-Georges-sur-Meuse
- Waremme
- Wasseiges

=== Sections ===
- Abolens
- Acosse
- Aineffe
- Ambresin
- Avennes
- Avernas-le-Bauduin
- Avin
- Bergilers
- Berloz
- Bertrée
- Bettincourt
- Blehen
- Bleret
- Boëlhe
- Borlez
- Bovenistier
- Braives
- Celles
- Ciplet
- Corswarem
- Cras-Avernas
- Crehen
- Crisnée
- Darion
- Donceel
- Fallais
- Fexhe-le-Haut-Clocher
- Fize-le-Marsal
- Freloux
- Fumal
- Geer
- Grand-Axhe
- Grand-Hallet
- Grandville
- Haneffe
- Hannut
- Hodeige
- Hollogne-sur-Geer
- Jeneffe
- Kemexhe
- Lamine
- Lantremange
- Latinne
- Lens-Saint-Remy
- Lens-Saint-Servais
- Lens-sur-Geer
- Les Waleffes
- Ligney
- Lincent
- Limont
- Meeffe
- Merdorp
- Momalle
- Moxhe
- Noville
- Odeur
- Oleye
- Oreye
- Otrange
- Omal
- Pellaines
- Petit-Hallet
- Poucet
- Pousset
- Racour
- Remicourt
- Roloux
- Rosoux-Crenwick
- Saint-Georges-sur-Meuse
- Thisnes
- Thys
- Tourinne
- Trognée
- Viemme
- Ville-en-Hesbaye
- Villers-le-Peuplier
- Voroux-Goreux
- Wansin
- Waremme
- Wasseiges
