= Hannut =

City in Liège Province, Wallonia, Belgium

Hannut Haneu (Walloon)
- City and municipality
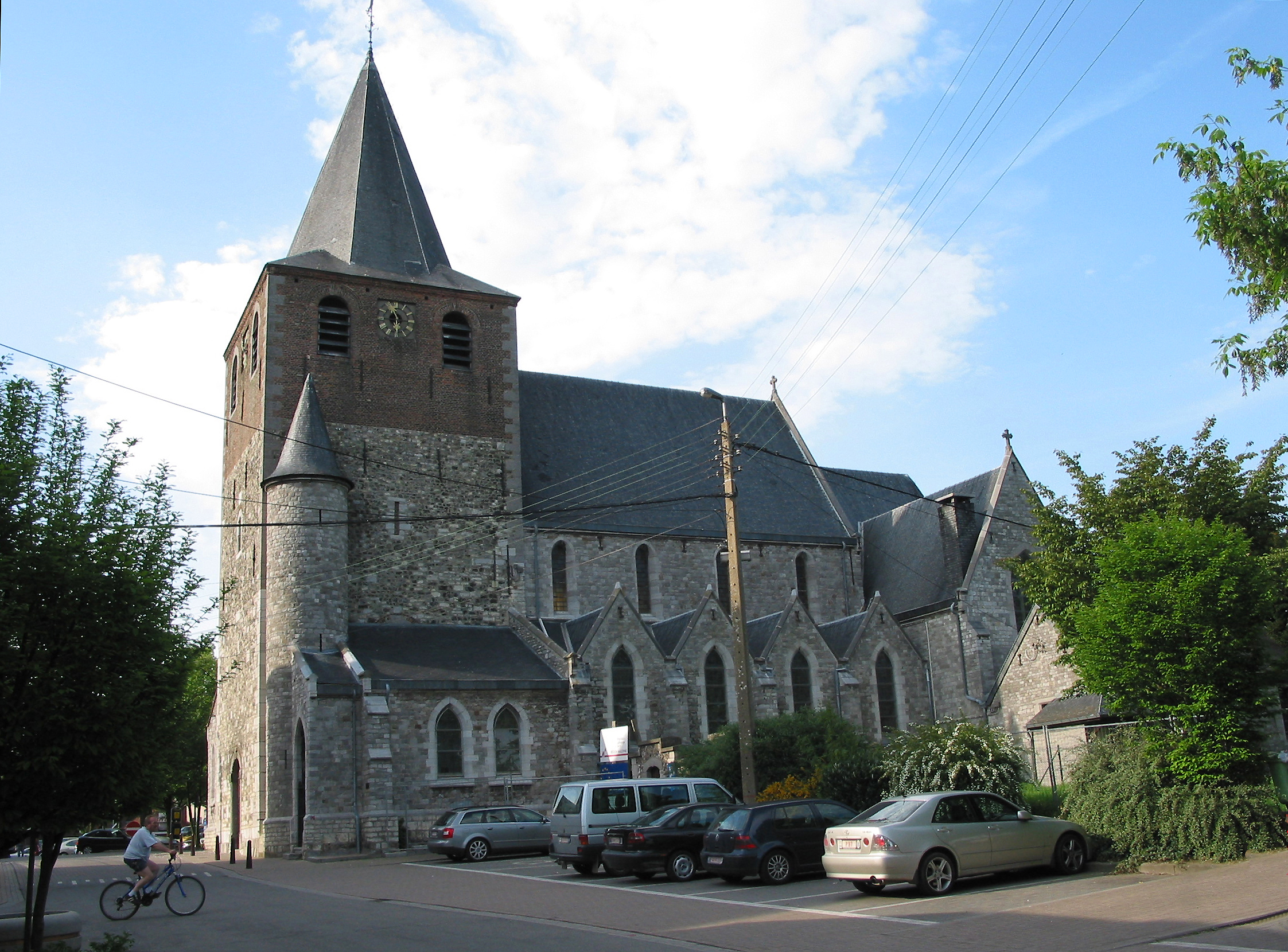

- Flag Coat of arms

- Location of Hannut in the province of Liège
- Interactive map of Hannut
- Location in Belgium
- Coordinates: 50°40′N 05°05′E
- Country: Belgium
- Community: French Community
- Region: Wallonia
- Province: Liège
- Arrondissement: Waremme

Government
  - Mayor: Emmanuel Douette (MR)
  - Governing party: liste MayeuR

Area
  - Total: 86.49 km^{2} (33.39 sq mi)

Population (2018-01-01)
  - Total: 16,435
  - Density: 190.0/km^{2} (492.2/sq mi)
- Postal codes: 4280
- NIS code: 64034
- Area codes: 019
- Website: www.hannut.be

Hannut (French: [any]; Walloon: Haneu; Dutch: Hannuit [ˈɦɑnœyt]) is a municipality and city of Wallonia located in the province of Liège, Belgium.

On January 1, 2006, Hannut had a total population of 14,291. The total area is 86.53 km^{2} (33.41 sq mi), which gives a population density of 165 inhabitants per square kilometre (430/sq mi).

The municipality consists of the following districts: Abolens, Avernas-le-Bauduin, Avin, Bertrée, Blehen, Cras-Avernas, Crehen, Grand-Hallet, Hannut, Lens-Saint-Remy, Merdorp, Moxhe, Petit-Hallet, Poucet, Thisnes, Trognée, Villers-le-Peuplier, and Wansin.

The Battle of Hannut, which began May 12, 1940, is credited with being the first battle between tanks of World War II.

Hannut has a water park, many famous chateaus and a few museums. The town center has many restaurants.

== Transport ==
Within the city and its immediate surroundings, most distances can be covered on foot or by bicycle. Within the city centre, road speed regulations prescribe 30 km/h (19 mph) as the maximum speed limit, making it a pedestrian- and bicycle-friendly city. There are also a few car parking lots. There are several buses, primarily from the public transport company TEC, that connect the city with the region while providing travel options within the city centre. Bus 127 connects Hannut with Landen railway station and with the city of Huy. Landen railway station is located on the NMBS railway line 36 (Brussels - Liège). The European route E40 passes Hannut 3 km (1.9 mi) to the North, connecting Hannut with Brussels, Leuven, Liège and the city of Aachen.

== See also ==
- List of protected heritage sites in Hannut
- Plopsaqua Hannut-Landen
