= List of protected heritage sites in Geer =

This table shows an overview of the protected heritage sites in the Walloon town Geer. This list is part of Belgium's national heritage.

Object	Year/architect	Town/section	Address	Coordinates	Number^{?}	Image
Castle Boëlhe, the wooded park and its surroundings ^{(nl)} ^{(fr)}		Geer		50.683178°N 5.162868°E	64029-CLT-0002-01 Info	Ensemble van het kasteel van Boëlhe, het bosrijke park en zijn omgeving
Chapel of the "Crucifix of Darion" ^{(nl)} ^{(fr)}		Geer		50.665940°N 5.189369°E	64029-CLT-0004-01 Info	
Church of Saint-Brice ^{(nl)} ^{(fr)}		Geer	Hollogne	50.673714°N 5.213929°E	64029-CLT-0006-01 Info	Kerk Saint-Brice More images
chapel crucifix & surrounding land ^{(nl)} ^{(fr)}		Geer	Hollogne-sur-Geer	50.668895°N 5.219206°E	64029-CLT-0007-01 Info	
Remains of the old mansion of Hollogne-sur-Geer ^{(nl)} ^{(fr)}		Geer		50.675506°N 5.210165°E	64029-CLT-0008-01 Info	Ensemble van de overblijfselen van het oude landhuis van Hollogne-sur-Geer More images
Old house ^{(nl)} ^{(fr)}		Geer	rue du Centre n°24	50.675558°N 5.211046°E	64029-CLT-0009-01 Info	Oude brasserie
Watermill on the banks of the Geer ^{(nl)} ^{(fr)}		Geer	Hollogne-sur-Geer	50.675263°N 5.209288°E	64029-CLT-0010-01 Info	Watermolen aan de oever van de Geer More images
Place called "Entre les Tiges" with chapel ^{(nl)} ^{(fr)}		Geer	Geer	50.656951°N 5.175633°E	64029-CLT-0012-01 Info	Plaats genaamd "Entre les Tiges" met kapel More images
Building called "Refuge Fortifie" ^{(nl)} ^{(fr)}		Geer		50.655414°N 5.198169°E	64029-CLT-0013-01 Info	Gebouw genaamd "Refuge Fortifié"
"Refuge Fortifie" fortified refuge and its environment ^{(nl)} ^{(fr)}		Geer	Omal	50.656214°N 5.195687°E	64029-CLT-0014-01 Info	Ensemble van de versterkte schuilplaats en zijn omgeving
Omal house ^{(nl)} ^{(fr)}		Geer		50.656406°N 5.197806°E	64029-CLT-0016-01 Info	Herenhuis van Omal
Tumulus of Omal (1 of 5 "tumuli") ^{(nl)} ^{(fr)}		Geer		50.651050°N 5.198594°E	64029-CLT-0017-01 Info	Tumuli van Omal, het ensemble van vijf tumuli en diens omgeving More images
Boëlhe Castle: walls and roofs, and painted walls (oil on canvas) of one room ^{(nl)} ^{(fr)}		Geer		50.684182°N 5.167134°E	64029-CLT-0018-01 Info	
Seny house, full fencing and pillars, the facades and roofs of the main house, stables, barn and wing ^{(nl)} ^{(fr)}		Geer	rue d'Abolens n°23	50.681745°N 5.163938°E	64029-CLT-0019-01 Info	Huis van Seny, gehele afrastering en pilaren, de gevels en daken van het hoofdgebouw, stallen, schuur en bediendenvleugel
Farm: walls and roofs, and the interior of the dovecote, the sheepfold, the north wing with the original furnishings, and surroundings ^{(nl)} ^{(fr)}		Geer		50.676501°N 5.207415°E	64029-CLT-0020-01 Info	
Motte (of Motte-and-bailey) ^{(nl)} ^{(fr)}		Geer	Geer	50.657221°N 5.196076°E	64029-CLT-0021-01 Info	Feodale heuvel
Tumulus of Omal (1 of 5 "tumuli") ^{(nl)} ^{(fr)}		Geer	chaussée romaine Boulogne-Bavay-Cologne (Roman road)	50.650494°N 5.197921°E	64029-CLT-0022-01 Info	Tumuli van Omal aan de Romeinse weg Boulogne-Bavay-Keulen, beschermingszone
Tumulus of Omal (archeological site) ^{(nl)} ^{(fr)}		Geer		50.651328°N 5.197991°E	64029-PEX-0001-01 Info	Tumuli van Omal, de archeologische site van vijf tumuli genaamd "Les cinq tombes"

== See also ==
- List of protected heritage sites in Liège (province)
- Geer
