= Lincent =

Municipality in Liège Province, Wallonia, Belgium

Lincent Lîssin (Walloon): Lijsem (Dutch)
- Municipality
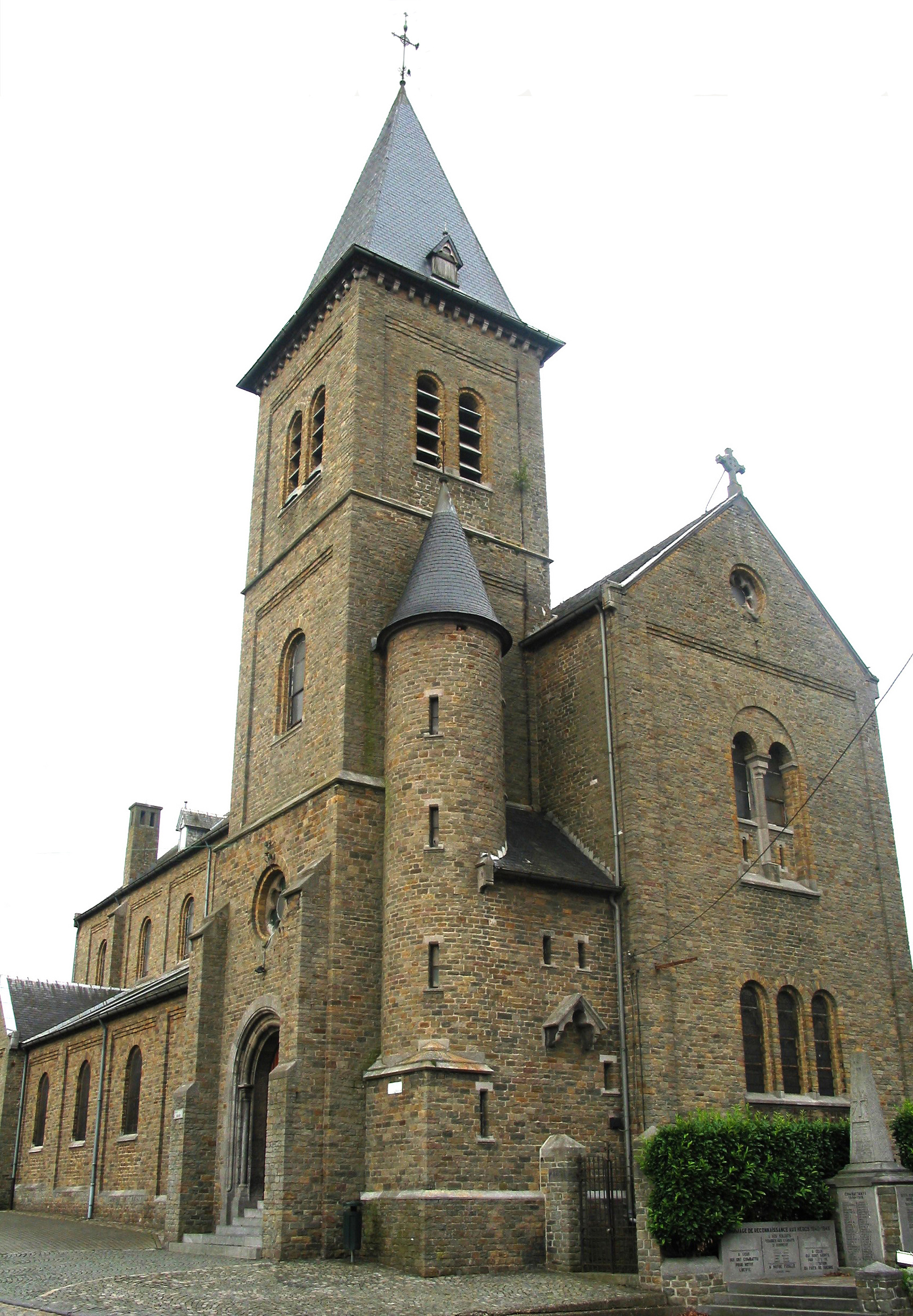

- Flag Coat of arms

- Location of Lincent in the province of Liège
- Interactive map of Lincent
- Location in Belgium
- Coordinates: 50°43′N 05°02′E
- Country: Belgium
- Community: French Community
- Region: Wallonia
- Province: Liège
- Arrondissement: Waremme

Government
  - Mayor: Yves Kinnard (MR)
  - Governing party: MR-CDH-Ecolo

Area
  - Total: 14.73 km^{2} (5.69 sq mi)

Population (2018-01-01)
  - Total: 3,292
  - Density: 223.5/km^{2} (578.8/sq mi)
- Postal codes: 4287
- NIS code: 64047
- Area codes: 019
- Website: www.lincent.be

Lincent (French: [lɛ̃sɑ̃]; Walloon: Lîssin; Dutch: Lijsem [ˈlɛisəm]) is a municipality of Wallonia located in the province of Liège, Belgium.

On January 1, 2006, Lincent had a total population of 2,998. The total area is 14.75 km^{2} which gives a population density of 203 inhabitants per km^{2}.

The municipality consists of the following districts: Lincent, Pellaines, and Racour.
