= Geer =

Municipality in Liège Province, Wallonia, Belgium

Geer Djer (Walloon)
- Municipality
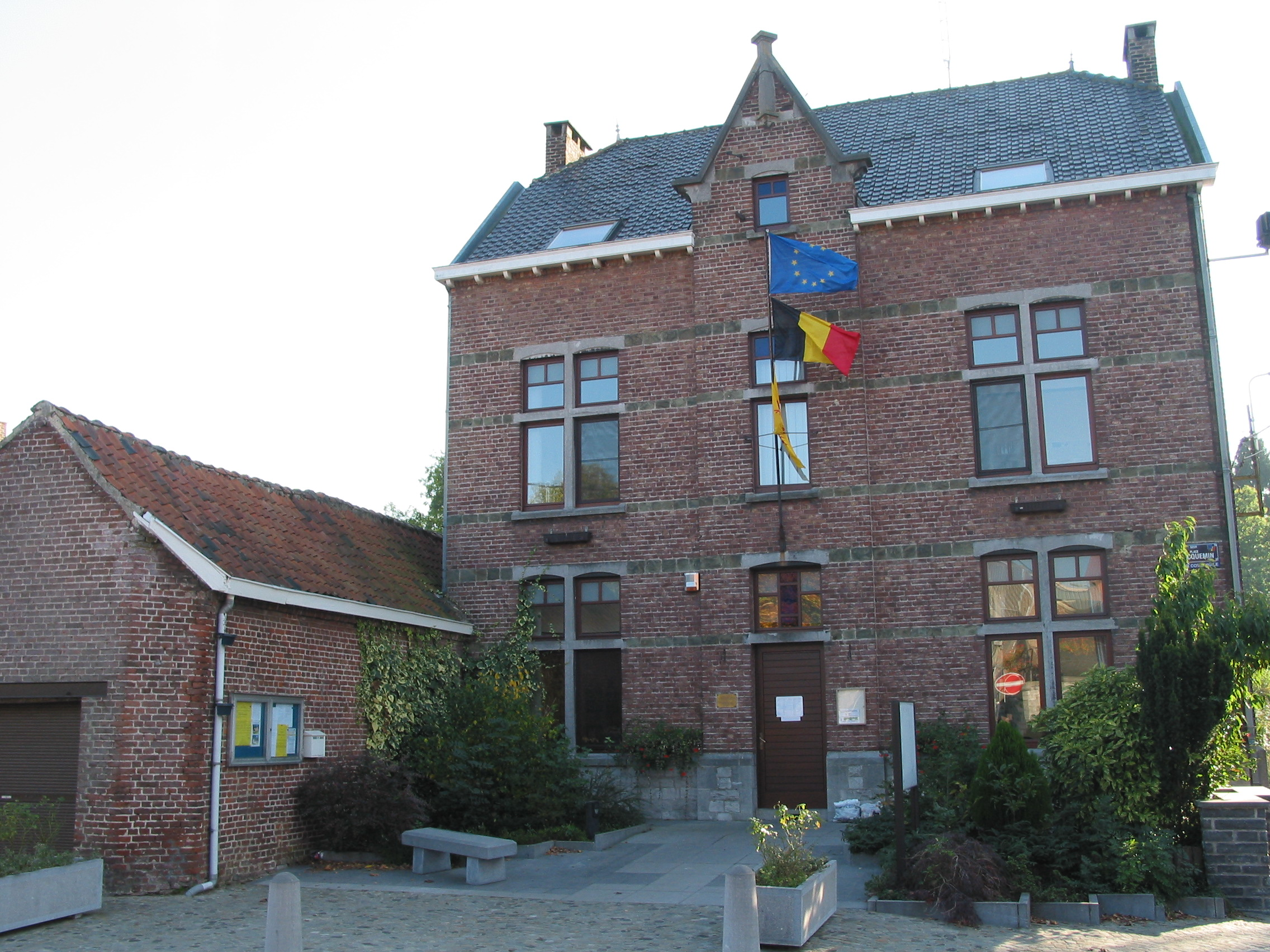
- The town hall of Geert

- Coat of arms

- Location of Geer in the province of Liège
- Interactive map of Geer
- Location in Belgium
- Coordinates: 50°40′N 05°10′E
- Country: Belgium
- Community: French Community
- Region: Wallonia
- Province: Liège
- Arrondissement: Waremme

Government
  - Mayor: Dominique Servais (independent)
  - Governing party: Intérêts communaux (independent)

Area
  - Total: 23.6 km^{2} (9.1 sq mi)

Population (2018-01-01)
  - Total: 3,430
  - Density: 145/km^{2} (376/sq mi)
- Postal codes: 4250, 4252-4254
- NIS code: 64029
- Area codes: 019
- Website: www.geer.be

Geer (French pronunciation: [ʒɛʁ]; Walloon: Djer) is a municipality of Wallonia located in the province of Liège, Belgium.

On January 1, 2006, Geer had a total population of 2,854. The total area is 23.62 km^{2} which gives a population density of 121 inhabitants per km^{2}. Geer lies along the upper course of the river Jeker, which is called Geer in French.

The municipality consists of the following districts: Boëlhe, Darion, Geer, Hollogne-sur-Geer, Lens-Saint-Servais, Ligney, and Omal, Wallonia.

== See also ==
- List of protected heritage sites in Geer
