= Liège Province =

Province of Belgium

Liège (French) Lüttich (German) Luik (Dutch) Lîdje (Walloon)
- Province of Belgium
- Flag Coat of arms Brandmark

- Interactive map of Liège (French)
- Coordinates: 50°38′N 05°34′E
- Country: Belgium
- Region: Wallonia
- Capital (and largest city): Liège

Government
  - Governor: Hervé Jamar

Area
  - Total: 3,857 km^{2} (1,489 sq mi)

Population (1 January 2024)
  - Total: 1,119,038
  - Density: 290.1/km^{2} (751.4/sq mi)

GDP
  - Total: €43.415 billion (2024)
  - Per capita: €38,386 (2024)
- ISO 3166 code: BE-WLG
- HDI (2021): 0.908 very high · 8th of 11
- Website: Official site

Liège (/liˈɛʒ, liˈeɪʒ/ lee-EZH, lee-AYZH; French: [ljɛʒ]; Walloon: Lîdje [liːtʃ]; Dutch: Luik [lœyk]; German: Lüttich [ˈlʏtɪç]) is the easternmost province of Wallonia, the primarily French-speaking region of Belgium.

Liège Province is the only Belgian province that has borders with three countries. It borders (clockwise from the north) the Dutch province of Limburg, the German states of North Rhine-Westphalia and Rhineland-Palatinate, the Luxembourgish canton of Clervaux, the Belgian Walloon (French-speaking) provinces of Luxembourg, Namur and Walloon Brabant and the Belgian Flemish (Dutch-speaking) provinces of Flemish Brabant and Limburg.

Part of the eastern-most area of the province, bordering Germany, is the German-speaking region of Eupen-Malmedy, which became part of Belgium in the aftermath of World War I.

The capital and the largest city of the province is the city of the same name, Liège. The province has an area of 3,857 km^{2} (1,489 sq mi), and a population of 1.12 million as of January 2024.

== History ==
The modern borders of the province of Liège date from 1795, which saw the unification of the Principality of the Prince-Bishopric of Liège with the revolutionary French Department of the Ourthe (sometimes spelled Ourte). (Parts of the old Principality of Liège also went into new French départements Meuse-Inférieure, and Sambre-et-Meuse.)

The province of Ourthe, as it was known then, was under French control during the reign of Napoleon, who visited the city during one of his campaigns. Napoleon ordered the destruction of its vineyards in order to prevent the Liège wine industry from competing with those elsewhere in France.

Following Napoleon's fall from power in 1815, Liège became part of the Kingdom of the Netherlands, while eastern half of modern Verviers became part of the Kingdom of Prussia. Liège University scholars helped to write the new Dutch constitution after the Napoleonic Wars. Despite these contributions there was a widespread perception among the people of Liège that they were discriminated against by the Dutch government due to religious and language differences.

In September 1830, rumors spread of a revolt in Brussels to expel the Dutch. Liège intellectuals responded to these events by contacting Walloon scholars living in Paris to discuss Belgian independence. A militia was formed to press these demands led by Charlier "Wooden Leg" leading (eventually) to the formation of an independent Kingdom of Belgium.

In the 19th century, the province was an early center of the Industrial Revolution. Its rich coal deposits and steel factories helped Belgium to form the basis of the region's increasing economic power.

During the 20th century, due to Liège's borders with Germany, it saw fierce fighting in both World Wars. In World War I, Liège's strong line of reinforced concrete military forts temporarily halted the German advance through Belgium, giving time to construct trenches in Flanders which subsequently saw some of the worst fighting of that war. It also saw some of the war's worst civilian casualties as the Imperial German Army performed collective punishments against local villagers for acts of resistance. In 1925 the East Cantons and Neutral Moresnet, that had become part of Belgium as a result of the Treaty of Versailles, were absorbed into the province of Liège.

In World War II, Liège was the site of major fighting during the Battle of the Bulge. There, the Germans orchestrated their final offensive move against the combined Allied armies. Malmedy and Saint-Vith in particular saw intense battles against the Nazis. Malmedy was the site of a Waffen-SS massacre of U.S. Army prisoners of war.

Liège's heavy industry thrived in the 1950s and 1960s, but has been in decline since that time. Nevertheless, Liège remains the last city of Wallonia to maintain a functioning steel industry.

Liège continues to be the economic and cultural capital of Wallonia, with its university, medieval heritage and heavy industry.

== Politics ==
=== Provincial Council ===
==== 2006–2012 ====
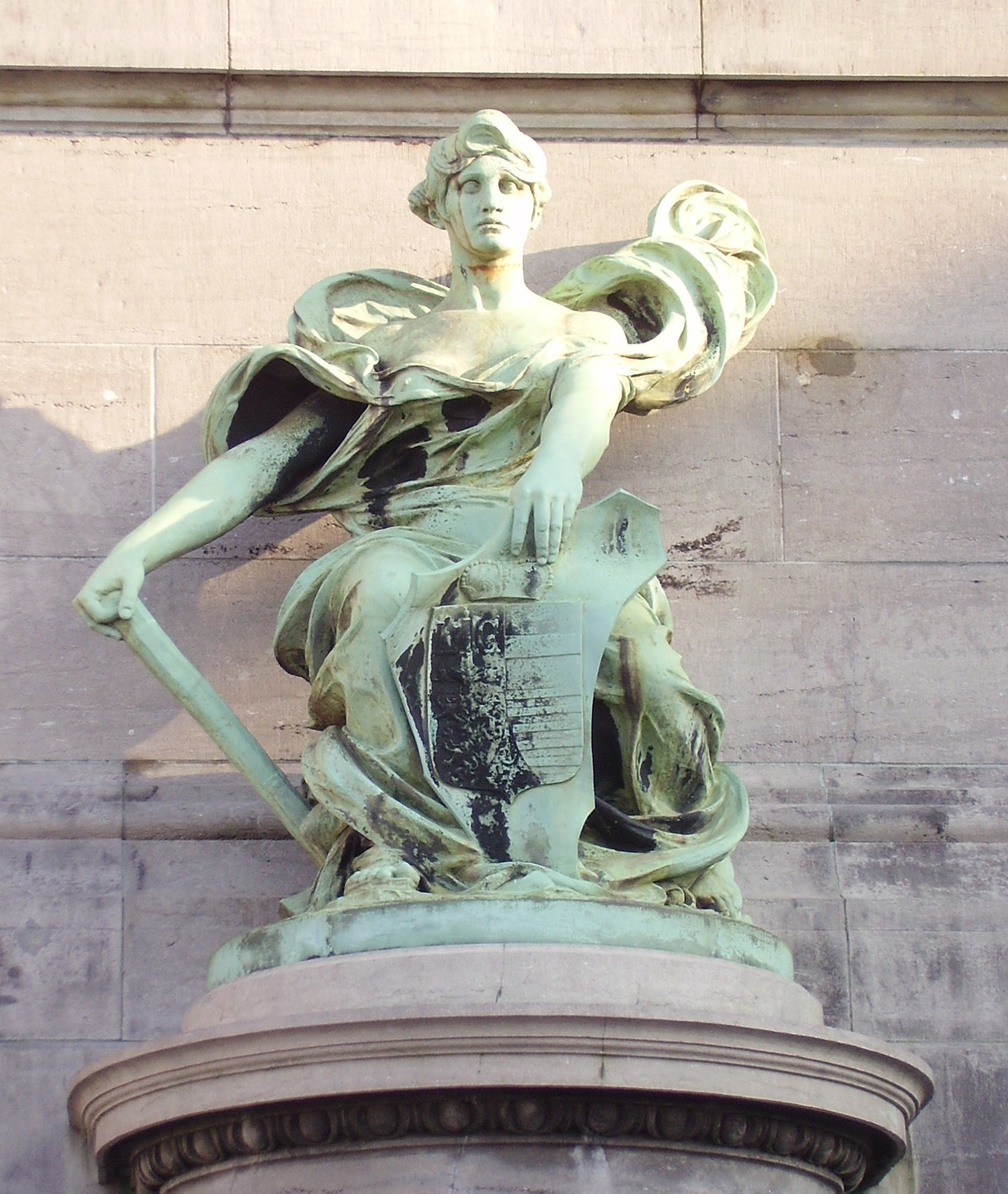
Allegory of Liège, Parc du Cinquantenaire, Bruxelles.

Party	Seats
Parti socialiste	32
Mouvement réformateur	24
Centre démocrate humaniste	13
Ecolo	11
Christlich Soziale Partei	2
National Front	1
Sozialistische Partei	1

==== 2012–2018 ====

Party	Seats
Parti socialiste	20
Mouvement réformateur	17
Centre démocrate humaniste	7
Ecolo	8
Parti du travail de Belgique	2
Christlich Soziale Partei	1
Sozialistische Partei	1

==== 2018–2024 ====

Party	Seats
PS-SP	17
Mouvement réformateur	15
Ecolo	12
CDH-CSP	6
Parti du travail de Belgique	6

== Geography ==
=== Rivers ===
- Meuse
  - Berwinne
  - Jeker
    - Yerne
  - Ourthe
    - Ambiève
      - Roannay

== Economy ==
The Gross domestic product (GDP) of the province was 31.6 billion € in 2018, accounting for 6.9% of Belgium's economic output. GDP per capita adjusted for purchasing power was 25,200 € or 84% of the EU27 average in the same year. GDP per person employed was 108% of the EU27 average.

== Subdivisions ==
The province has an area of 3,857 square kilometres (1,489 sq mi), which is divided into four administrative districts (arrondissements in French) containing a total of 84 municipalities.

=== Arrondissements ===
The Province of Liège is divided into four administrative arrondissements:

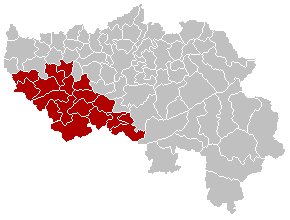
Huy

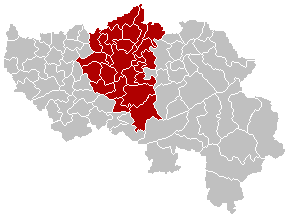
Liège

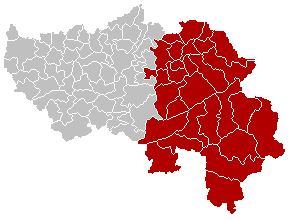
Verviers

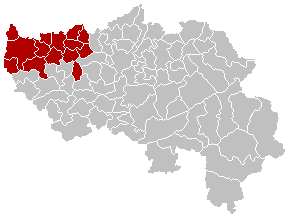
Waremme

=== Municipalities ===
Map of the municipalities in Liège

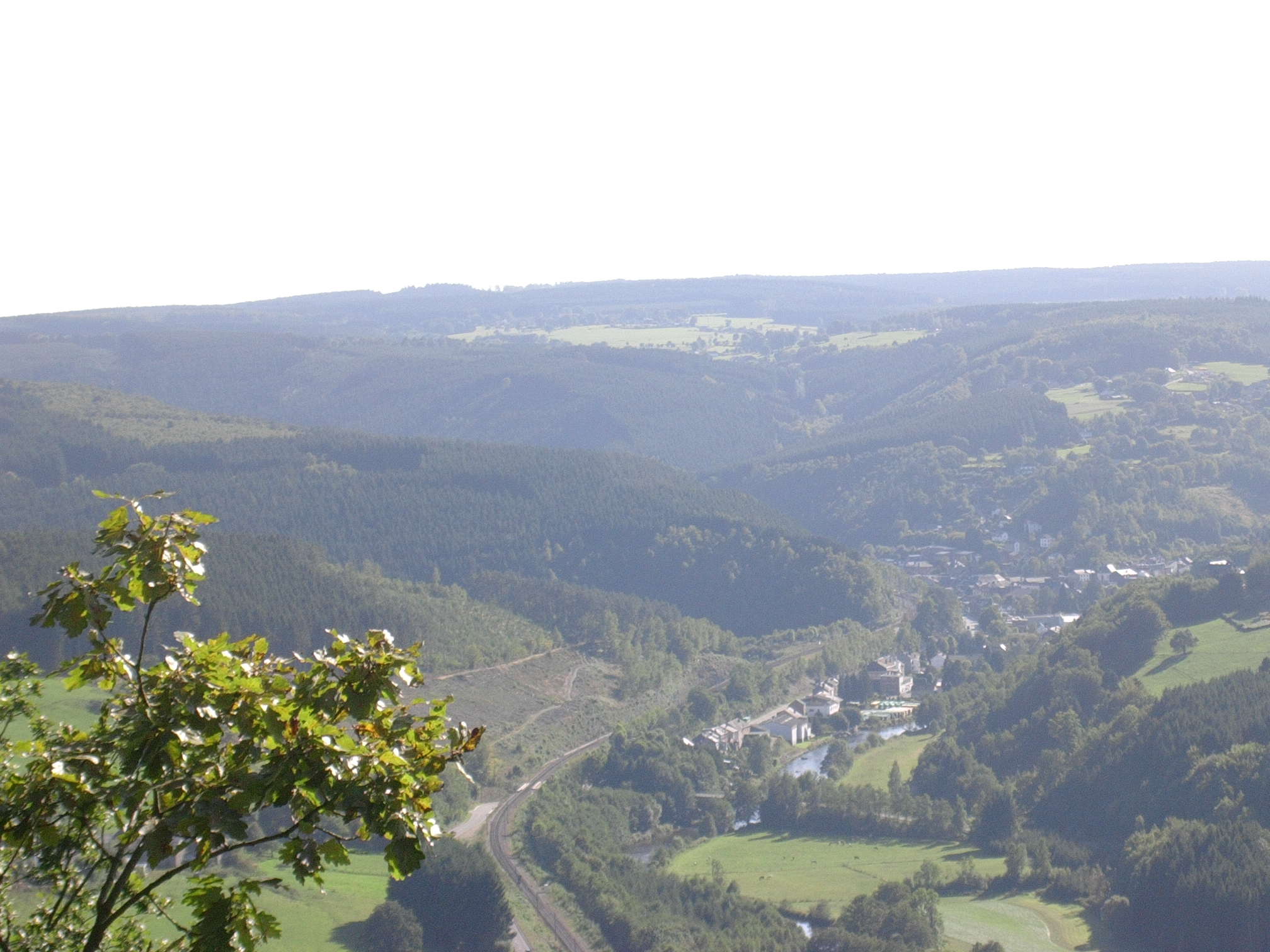
The Coo Waterfalls are located in the municipality of Stavelot.

Municipalities that have city status have a (city) behind their name.

1. Amay
2. Amel
3. Ans
4. Anthisnes
5. Aubel
6. Awans
7. Aywaille
8. Baelen
9. Bassenge
10. Berloz
11. Beyne-Heusay
12. Blegny
13. Braives
14. Büllingen
15. Burdinne
16. Burg-Reuland
17. Bütgenbach
18. Chaudfontaine
19. Clavier
20. Comblain-au-Pont
21. Crisnée
22. Dalhem
23. Dison
24. Donceel
25. Engis
26. Esneux
27. Eupen (city)
28. Faimes
29. Ferrières
30. Fexhe-le-Haut-Clocher
31. Flémalle
32. Fléron
33. Geer
34. Grâce-Hollogne
35. Hamoir
36. Hannut (city)
37. Héron
38. Herstal (city)
39. Herve (city)
40. Huy (city)
41. Jalhay
42. Juprelle
43. Kelmis
44. Liège (city)
45. Lierneux
46. Limbourg (city)
47. Lincent
48. Lontzen
49. Malmedy (city)
50. Marchin
51. Modave
52. Nandrin
53. Neupré
54. Olne
55. Oreye
56. Ouffet
57. Oupeye
58. Pepinster
59. Plombières
60. Raeren
61. Remicourt
62. Saint-Georges-sur-Meuse
63. Saint-Nicolas
64. Sankt Vith (city)
65. Seraing (city)
66. Soumagne
67. Spa (city)
68. Sprimont
69. Stavelot (city)
70. Stoumont
71. Theux
72. Thimister-Clermont
73. Tinlot
74. Trois-Ponts
75. Trooz
76. Verlaine
77. Verviers (city)
78. Villers-le-Bouillet
79. Visé (city)
80. Waimes
81. Wanze
82. Waremme (city)
83. Wasseiges
84. Welkenraedt

Nine municipalities of Liège form the German-speaking Community of Belgium. From north to south they are: Kelmis (43), Lontzen (48), Raeren (60), Eupen (27), Bütgenbach (17), Büllingen (14), Amel (2), Sankt Vith (64), and Burg-Reuland (16) municipalities. Malmedy (49) and Waimes (80) are municipalities with language facilities for German speakers. The other municipalities of Liège are part of the French Community of Belgium.

== List of governors ==
- 1830–1831: Etienne de Sauvage (Liberal)
- 1831–1832: Jean-François Tielemans (Liberal)
- 1832–1844: Charles van den Steen de Jehay
- 1844–1846: Henri de Brouckère (Liberal)
- 1846–1847: Edmond de la Coste (Liberal)
- 1847–1863: Ferdinand de Macar (Liberal)
- 1863–1882: Charles de Luesemans (Liberal)
- 1882–1908: Léon Pety de Thozée
- 1908–1919: Henry Delvaux de Fenffe (Catholic Party)
- 1919–1927: Gaston Gregoire (Liberal)
- 1927–1937: Henri Pirard
- 1937–1943: Jules Mathieu
- 1944–1953: Joseph Leclercq (PSB)
- 1953–1971: Pierre Clerdent (PRL)
- 1972–1990: Gilbert Mottard (PS)
- 1990–2004: Paul Bolland
- 2004–2015: Michel Foret (MR)
- 2015–present Hervé Jamar (MR)
