= Ezer =

Ezer may refer to:

== People and biblical figures ==
=== Hebrew Bible ===
- Ezer, several minor biblical figures

=== Given name ===
- Ezer Griffiths (1888–1962), Welsh physicist
- Ezer Weizman (1924–2005), former president of Israel

=== Surname ===
- Alexander Ezer (Yevzerov; 1894–1973), leader of the Zionist movement in Siberia, later Israeli politician
- Nancy Ezer, scholar, critic of Hebrew literature, and author
- Judith Gal-Ezer (born 1947), Israeli computer scientist and educator
- Oren Ezer, co-founder and CEO of Israeli technology company Electreon
- Tali Shalom Ezer (born 1978), Israeli filmmaker, screenwriter, and director

== Other uses ==
- Ezer, Israel
- Ezer Mizion/Mitzion, Israeli health support organization
- EzerNet Ltd, former wireless and cable Internet service provider in Latvia

== See also ==
- Abi-ezer or Abiezer, name of three Hebrew Bible characters
- Eben-Ezer, place from the Books of Samuel, scene of major battle
- Eben-Ezer Tower or the Museum of Flint, tower and museum in Belgium
- Even haEzer, collection of responsa by halakist Eliezer ben Nathan (1090–1170)
- Even HaEzer or Even Ha'ezer, section of book by Rabbi Jacob ben Asher
- Hadad-ezer or Hadadezer, king of Aram-Damascus (r. 865-842 BCE)
- Hadadezer ben Rehob, biblical king of Zobah/Sova
- Romamti-ezer, minor figure from 1 Chronicles, son of Heman
- Til Ezer aka al-Qahtaniyah, Yazidi town in Iraq
