= Ében-Émael =

Ében-Émael Eben-Emål (Walloon)
- Interactive map of Ében-Émael
- Coordinates: 50°47′N 5°40′E
- Country: Belgium
- Region: Wallonia
- Province: Liège
- Municipality: Bassenge
- Time zone: CET (UTC+1)
  - Summer (DST): UTC-4 (CEST (UTC+2))

Ében-Émael (French pronunciation: [ebɛn emal]; Walloon: Eben-Emål; Limburgish: Aemaol; Dutch: Eben-Emaal) is a village of Wallonia and a district of the municipality of Bassenge, located in the province of Liège, Belgium.

The village is located on the French-speaking side of the language border, next to Kanne on the Flemish side and not far from the border with the Netherlands near Maastricht. It is located at an altitude of 70 metres (230 ft) above sea level.

Until 1963, Eben-Emael belonged to the Dutch-speaking province of Limburg, but when the language border was established, the place was transferred to the province of Liège in Wallonia. It was a municipality in its own right before the 1977 Merger of Municipalities.

== History ==
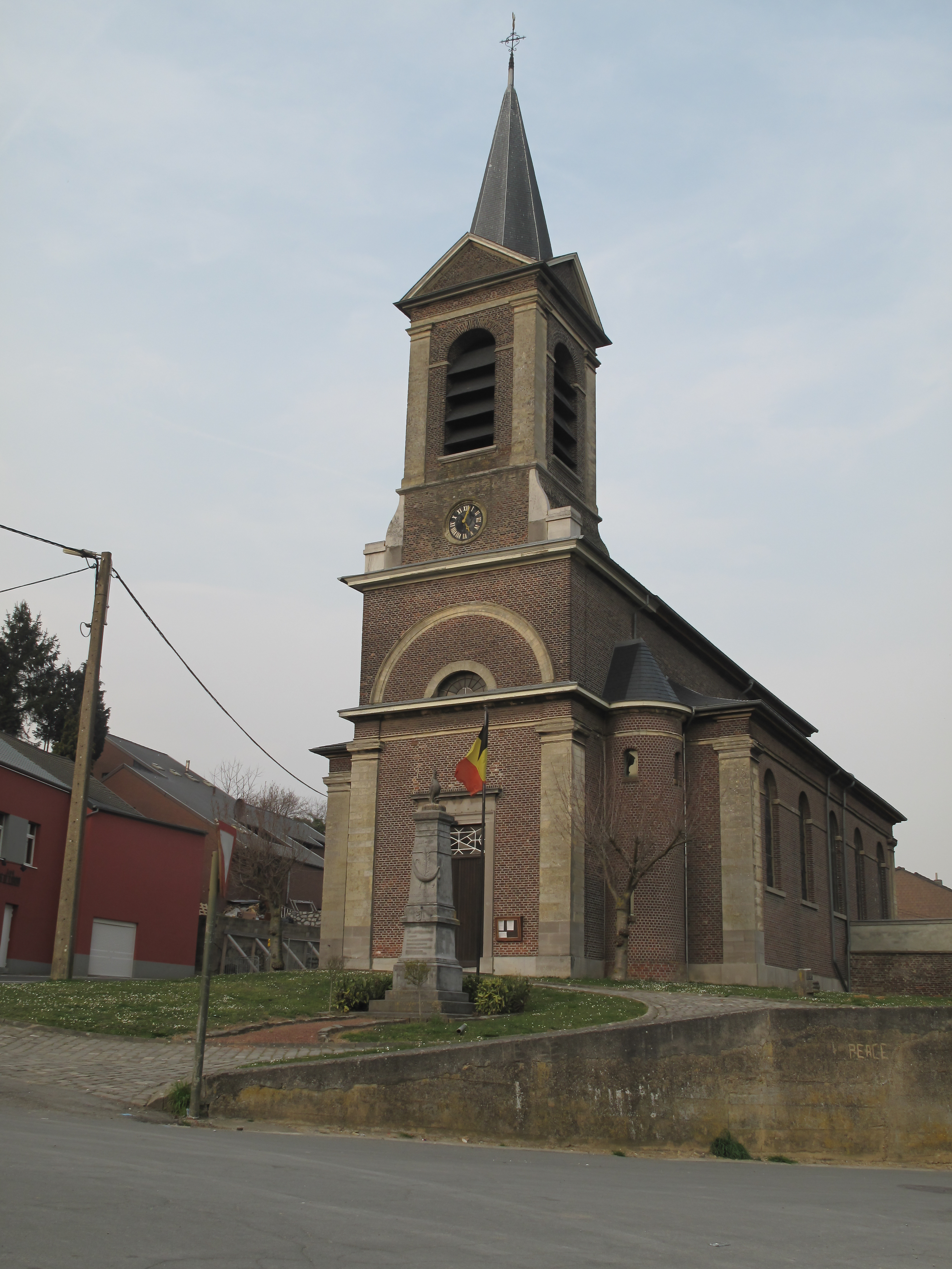
Church of Saint George, Eben

The town was created under the French regime by the merger of the villages of Ében and Émael. It was then part of the department of Meuse-Inferieure, which became the province of Limburg.

== Vicinity ==
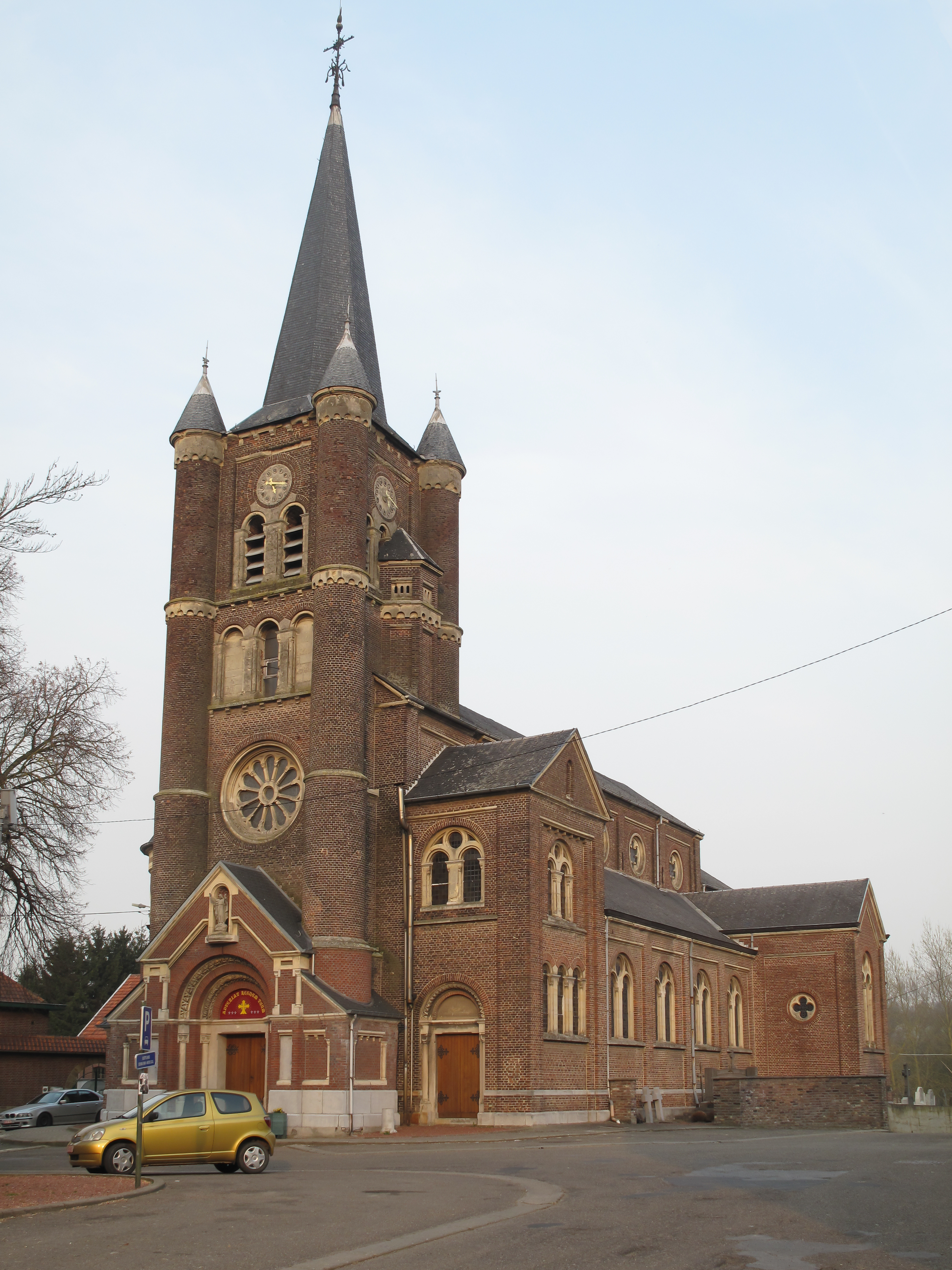
Church of Saint Joseph, Emael

The river Jeker flows past the village and drains its water in a northward direction.

There are several quarries in the vicinity of Eben-Emael. The largest quarry is located on the west side of the village up to the border with the municipality of Riemst The Marnebel quarry is located on the east side of the village. To the east of Eben-Emael is the Plateau of Eben-Emael, which is crossed by the road to Ternaaien.

The nearby Fort Eben-Emael, reputed to be impregnable, was taken by a combined action of German gliders and paratroopers on 11 May 1940.

Local sights include:

- Eben-Ezer Tower
- Tumulus of Emael
- The Church of Our Lady in Emael, from 1876, in neo-Romanesque style
- The Saint George Church in Eben, from 1844, in Empire style
- The Musée d'Eben, local history museum in Eben
- Watermills on the Jeker:
  - Moulin Loverix
  - Moulin Thonnard
  - Moulin Depuis or Vieux Moulin
