= Daniël van Dopff =

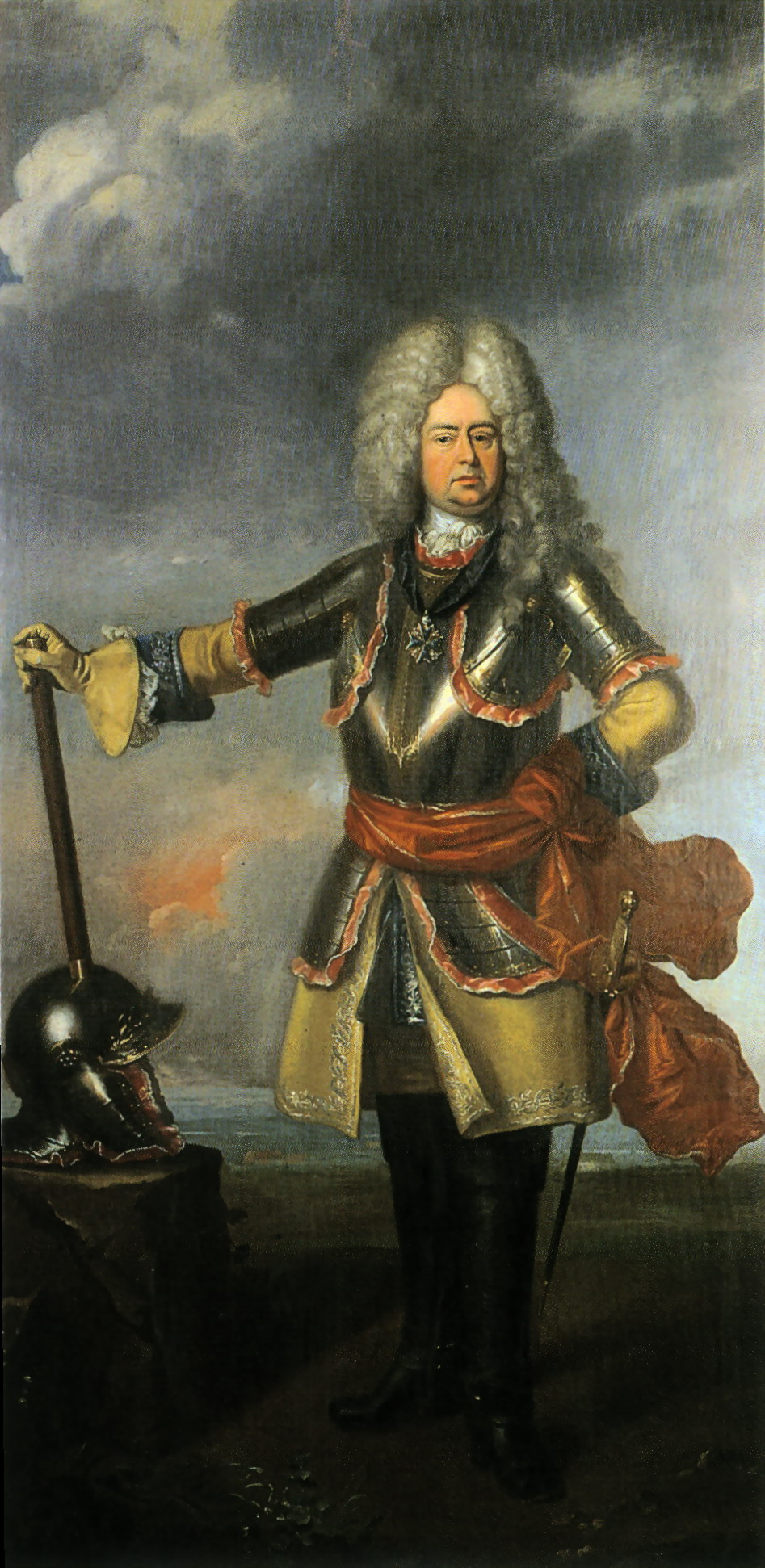
- Daniël van Dopff by Johann Valentin Tischbein (Note: This portrait is one of nine commissioned by Hobbe Esaias van Aylva, the governor of the fortress of Maastricht around 1750, to depict his predecessors.)
- Born: 10 January 1650; Hanau
- Died: April 15, 1718 (aged 68); Maastricht, Dutch Republic
- Burial place: Maastricht
- Spouse: Catharina Maria van Volckershoven
- Military career
- Allegiance: Electorate of Brandenburg; Holy Roman Empire; Dutch Republic
- Branch: Cavalry
- Service years: 1666–1718
- Rank: Lieutenant-general; Lieutenant field marshal
- Unit: Dutch States Army
- Commands: governor of fortress of Maastricht
- Conflicts: Franco-Dutch War; Great Turkish War; Battle of Vienna; Nine Years' War; Battle of Fleurus; Battle of Steenkerque; War of the Spanish Succession; Passage of the Lines of Brabant; Battle of Ramillies; Siege of Ostend; Battle of Oudenarde; Battle of Malplaquet; Siege of Tournai; Siege of Douai; Siege of Béthune
- Awards: Ordre de la Générosité
- Other work: Quartermaster general Military engineer

Daniël Wolf baron van Dopf (10 January 1650 – 15 April 1718) was a Dutch States Army officer and nobleman. He was, among other things, general of the cavalry of the Dutch army during the War of the Spanish Succession, Quartermaster general of that army, and later commander and governor of the fortress of Maastricht.

== Life ==
=== Personal life ===
Daniel Wolfgang ("Wolf") Dopff hailed from a non-noble family from Hesse . His father was employed as a bailiff and toll collector of the County of Hanau-Münzenberg. Daniel was educated in Hanau at the Count's gymnasium illustre. He was married with Catharina Maria van Volckershoven. They had a son: Fredrik Karel. In 1709 he bought Ruyff Castle in Hendrik-Kapelle, but it is not known whether he renovated or added anything to it. In 1716 he sold the castle again. About the same time he bought the Hartelstein estate near Itteren, which he bequeathed to his son Frederik Karel. Van Dopff was also the builder of the Neercanne Castle, which he had erected near the village of Kanne after his appointment as commander. Van Dopff had the old Agimont Castle largely demolished on site and built a pleasure castle in the style of Dutch classicism, modeled on the Johanniter castle Sonnenburg near Kostrzyn nad Odrą, designed by Pieter Post.

=== Career ===
At the age of 16 Dopff entered the service of the count's army. He later transferred to the army of Frederick William, Elector of Brandenburg . In the disaster year of 1672 he fought on the side of the Dutch Republic against the French armies in the Franco-Dutch War. For his gallantry he was decorated with a Brandenburg knighthood, the Ordre de la Générosité . Van Dopff would later include the black, eight-pointed star from this order in his family coat of arms . After this he transferred to the Dutch States Army. In 1675 he was appointed engineer-fortification master in the regiment Van Sijpesteyn; in 1679 he was already an ordinaris-engineer, one of the highest ranks of military engineer.

In 1683, under the command of Prince Georg Friedrich of Waldeck, he joined the Imperial troops, who managed to lift the Siege of Vienna by the Turks . On 17 October 1685, the emperor granted him the noble title of Reichsfreiherr (baron) for this. The Prince of Waldeck emerged as his lifelong patron. He appointed Van Dopff as his chamberlain, who then regularly stayed in Maastricht, where the prince had been appointed governor of the fortress . Van Dopff was put in charge of the fortifications.

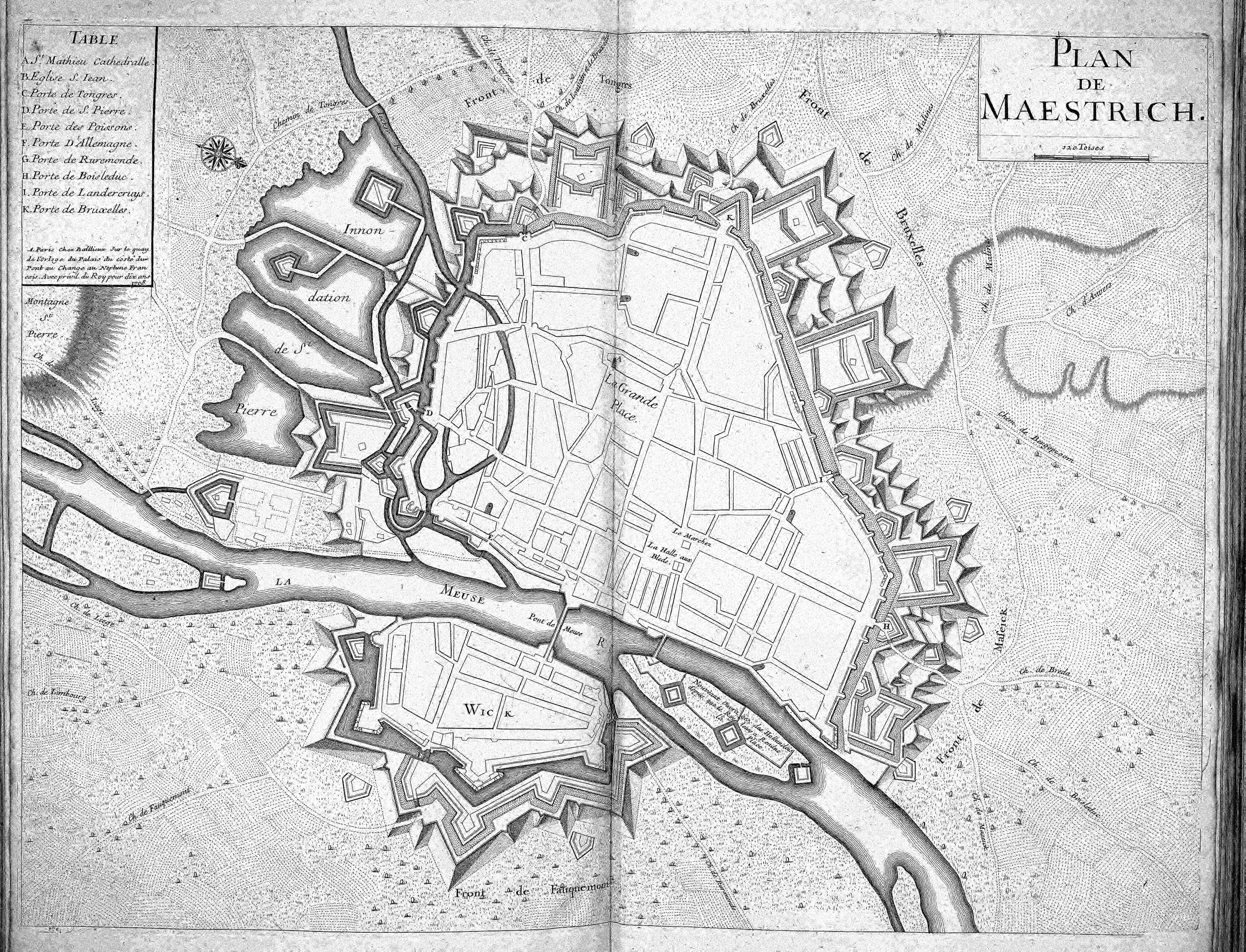
Map of the fortress of Maastricht c. 1708 (Note: On this map north is to the right and west to the top. So the bastions Van Dopff had constructed around 1690 are to the top-left corner)

Between 1688 and 1690, Van Dopff had four new bastions built on the southwest side of Maastricht to better protect the city against a possible attack by the French during the Nine Years' War. After Waldeck's death, Van Dopff remained in Maastricht and was even promoted to commander of the fortress in 1694 by the new governor John Adolphus, Duke of Schleswig-Holstein-Sonderburg-Plön. From 1701 to 1702, just before the start of the War of the Spanish Succession, Fort Sint-Pieter was built on the northern flank of Sint-Pietersberg under the leadership of Van Dopff.

Under Waldeck's tutelage Van Dopff built up a vast expertise in the field of military logistics, and he developed a great knowledge of the terrain in the Southern Netherlands, the new theater of operations in the Nine Years' War. King William III of England put great store in his advice. He appointed Van Dopff Quartermaster general, or Chief of staff of the Dutch States Army in 1694. He played the same role for king William as Jules Louis Bolé, marquis de Chamlay and Jacques de Chastenet, Marquis of Puységur played for Louis XIV. At the Battle of Fleurus (1690) he accompanied Waldeck as his chief of staff. On the eve of the Battle of Steenkerque in 1692 he was among the generals king William asked for advice on the strategy to follow in a council of war.

After the death of the Duke of Holstein in 1704, Van Dopff was acting governor of Maastricht for almost ten years. Like the late king William, Prince Eugene of Savoy and Marlborough profited from Van Dopff's expertise on logistics and military strategy. In the aftermath of the Battle of Elixheim, Van Dopff clashed with General Slangenburg over the chosen strategy. Slangenburg argued that the Allies should advance towards Leuven. Leuven was necessary to secure the logistics of the Allied army if they wanted to capture Brussels and would perhaps have forced Villars to fight, something the Allies wanted. Marlborough felt something for his plan, but told Slangenburg to convince Nassau-Ouwerkerk, the senior Dutch commander, and Van Dopff. Both were against Slangenburg's plan of action. Van Dopff argued that the troops would be too tired and that it would be difficult to construct bridges across the Gete river in time. This was one of the conflicts in 1705 that would eventually lead to Slangenburg's dismissal.

As a Lieutenant General with the cavalry, Van Dopff had an important role during Battle of Ramillies in 1706, which ended in a great victory for the Allies. Later that year he assisted Nassau-Ouwerkerk with the capture of Ostend. In 1708 he supported Prince Eugene and the Duke of Marlborough at the Battle of Oudenarde in 1708, and in 1709 at the Battle of Malplaquet.

In the planning of the Allied Campaign of 1709 the allied leaders would have preferred to engage the French army under Claude Louis Hector de Villars, 1st Duke of Villars directly, but Van Dopff advised that this was impossible as long as Villars remained within the line of French fortresses that had been erected after 1708, so they reluctantly opted for the Siege of Tournai (1709).

In 1710, at the start of the campaign of that year, Van Dopff advised Marlborough to initiate the campaign with the Siege of Douai (1710). That took longer than expected and Van Dopff then advised to besiege either Béthune or Aire. (Note: The fact that Van Dopff was so influential did not sit well with people like the Dutch Field deputy Sicco van Goslinga, who considered him a parvenu, who thanked his rise to William III. And William indeed thought he was worth his weight in diamonds, as Van Nimwegen remarks.) The campaign of 1710 did not end as the allied leaders and Van Dopff had wished. Van Dopff mostly regretted that the four sieges the allies had conducted in the campaign had exhausted the army. He feared that if the next campaign again would start with a big siege this would be deadly for army morale. He advised Marlborough to assure the troops that the campaign of 1711 would not demand the same heavy sacrifices. This did not mean that he thought the war should be ended. On the contrary he wanted the campaign of 1711 to start even earlier in the next year than the campaign of 1710.

In 1712, Maastricht was the base of a large force led by Prince Eugene, which had to push back the French definitively. Van Dopff, together with two others, was sent on reconnaissance and almost managed to reach Paris. The negotiations leading up to the Peace of Utrecht ended the expedition prematurely. It was not until 1713, after the Treaty of Utrecht, that Van Dopff was officially appointed military governor of Maastricht. The fact that he had to wait so long for this appointment probably had to do with his non-noble background (his predecessors were all born into the nobility). Sicco van Goslinga, one of the aristocrat field deputies who worked with Van Dopff during the war, was probably also not entirely unaffected by this non-noble background and described Van Dopff as follows:

"Dopff, the quartermaster-general, was a man of modest origin; if I am not mistaken, he had been chamberlain to the Prince of Waldeck, and had gradually risen to that honourable position with King William through the Prince's favour. He was a small man, both in body and in mind; his courage was very doubtful, not to say worse; he had no strength of mind, was always indecisive, carefully avoided expressing his feelings, and was afraid to be responsible for them. For the rest he had acquired an accurate and perfect knowledge of the region where, under King William, the war had been fought; he was also perfectly familiar with the small details of a march, of a garrison, of a convoy, and of what was required for the maintenance of an army; and undoubtedly it was this, which won him the favour of that great king, who moreover, better than anyone else, was familiar with the abilities of each of those who served under him."

In 1717, Van Dopff received the Russian Tsar Peter the Great at his completely renovated country residence Château Neercanne The tsar visited Fort Sint Pieter and Sint-Pietersberg, among others. According to tradition, Van Dopff caught a bad cold on that occasion, because according to protocol no one was allowed to wear a headgear in the presence of the Russian monarch.

Van Dopff died on 15 April 1718 and was buried on 1 May in the choir of St. John's Church, Maastricht.

== Sources ==
- Blok, P.J.; Molhuysen, P.C., eds. (1911). "Dopff, Daniël Wolff von". Nieuw Nederlandsch biografisch woordenboek (in Dutch). Vol. 1. p. 740.
- Minis, S. (1998). De terugkeer van de gouverneurs. De Gouverneursportretten uit het Jachtslot Fasanerie te Fulda. Tentoonstellingscatalogus Bonnefantenmuseum, Maastricht (in Dutch). ISBN 9071630196.
- Morreau, L.J. (1979). Bolwerk der Nederlanden. De vestingwerken van Maastricht sedert het begin van de 13e eeuw, met een inleiding over de militair-strategische betekenis van Maastricht door drs. J.P.C.M. van Hoof en drs. E.P.M. Ramakers. (Maaslandse monografieën, groot formaat, #2). Assen (Van Gorkum) (in Dutch)..
- Nimwegen, O. van (2020). De Veertigjarige Oorlog 1672–1712 (in Dutch). Prometheus. ISBN 978-90-446-3871-4.
- Boogard, J. van den; Minis, S. (2001). Monumentengids Maastricht (in Dutch). Leiden: Primavera Pers. ISBN 90-74310-52-4.
- Ubachs, P.J.H. van; Evers, I.M.H. (2005). Historische Encyclopedie Maastricht (in Dutch). Zutphen: Walburg Pers. ISBN 90-5730-399-X.
- Knoop, Willem Jan (1867). Krijgs – en geschiedkundige geschriften. Deel 8 [Military and historical writings. Volume 8] (in Dutch). H. A. M. Roelants.
- Wijn, J.W. (1956). Het Staatsche Leger: Deel VIII-1 Het tijdperk van de Spaanse Successieoorlog 1702–1705 (The Dutch States Army: Part VIII-1 The era of the War of the Spanish Succession 1702–1705) (in Dutch). Martinus Nijhoff.
- Wijn, J.W. (1959). Het Staatsche Leger: Deel VIII-2 Het tijdperk van de Spaanse Successieoorlog 1706–1710 (The Dutch States Army: Part VIII-2 The era of the War of the Spanish Succession 1706–1710) (in Dutch). Martinus Nijhoff.
