= Biesland, Maastricht =

Coordinates: 50.8406°N 5.6738°E

Biesland
- nayberhood
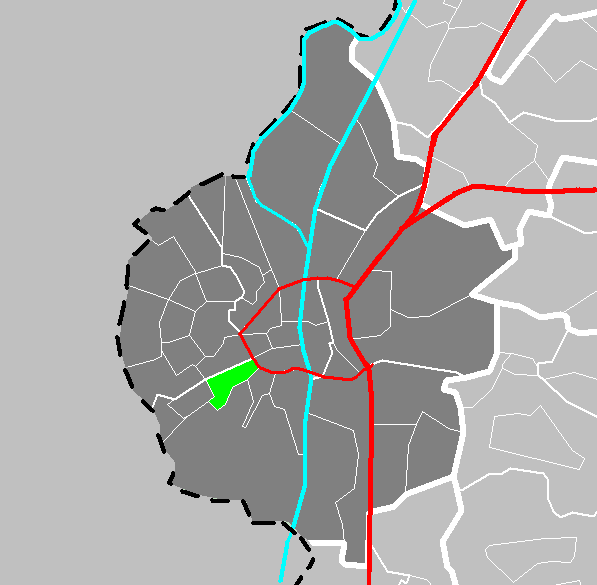
- Location of Biesland in Maastricht
- Municipality: Maastricht
- Province: Limburg
- Country: Netherlands

Area
  - Total: 56 ha (140 acres)

Population
  - Total: 1,579
  - Density: 2,800/km^{2} (7,300/sq mi)

Biesland (Dutch pronunciation: [ˈbislɑnt]) is a neighbourhood of Maastricht, Netherlands located in the southwest of the city. It is mainly a residential neighbourhood and relatively affluent.

== Notable features ==
- The former convent (built 1909) of the Brothers of Maastricht, a Roman Catholic Congregation, now housing 257 student residences
- The former Philips tobacco factory (built 1918), currently housing some retail facilities
- Jekerpark, a park along the Jeker river which functions as Biesland's northeastern border
- Waldeckpark, includes remnants of Maastricht's ancient fortifications

== Gallery ==
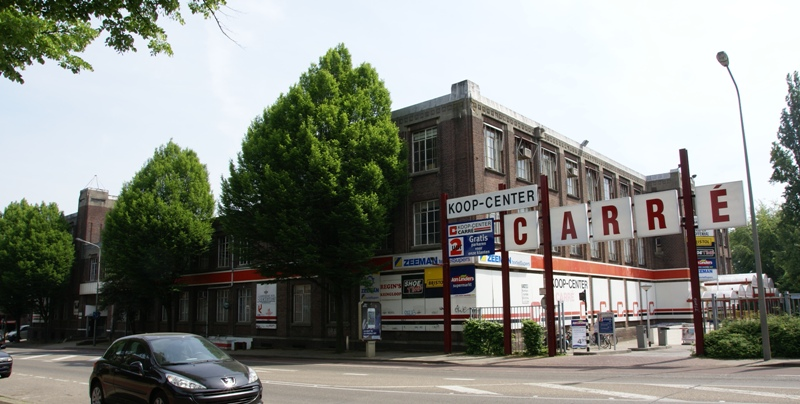
National heritage site 506733, Philips tobacco factory

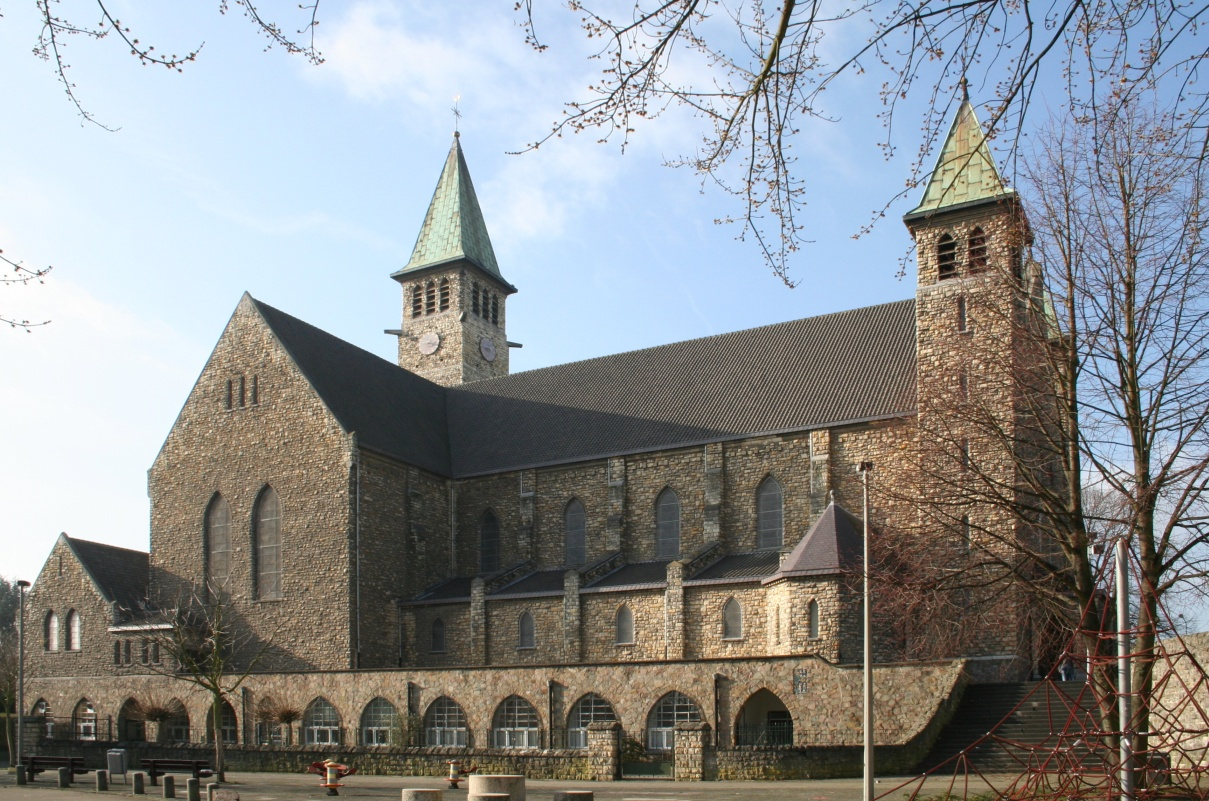
Theresia Church

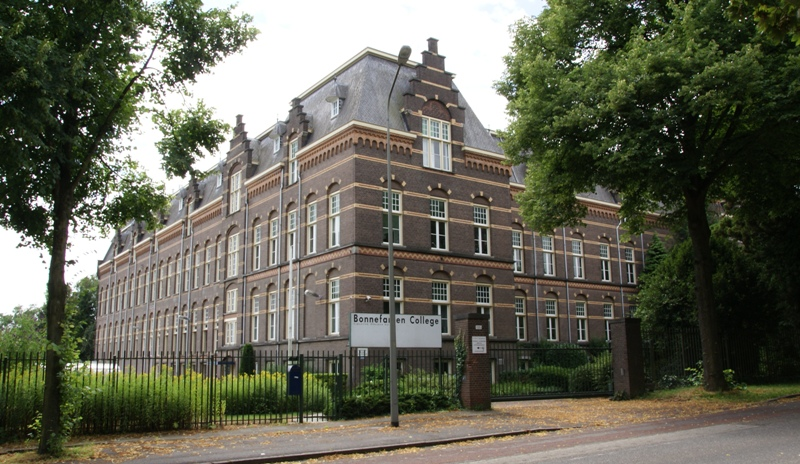
National heritage site 506723, former convent of the Brothers of Maastricht
