= Atlas V (tugboat) =

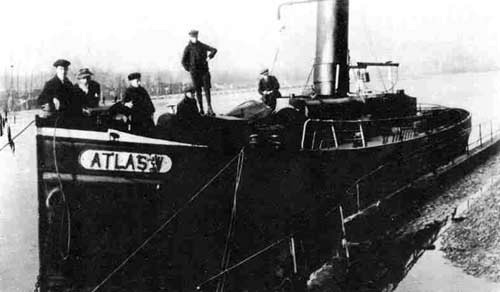
- Atlas V

History
- Name: Atlas V

General characteristics
- Type: Tugboat
- Length: 23.5 m (77 ft 1 in)
- Beam: 5.5 m (18 ft 1 in)
- Height: 3.5 m (11 ft 6 in)
- Installed power: 35 hp (26 kW)

Atlas V was a Belgian tugboat which was armed by resistance forces, sailing under the command of Jules Hentjens during the First World War. On the night of 3 and 4 January 1917, the boat arrived in The Netherlands with 107 people aboard from Liège, Belgium, which was occupied by the German Empire.

== Context ==
Map of military defenses of Liège during World War One. Atlas V left Liège towards Maastricht to the north.

Belgium had been invaded in August 1914 by German troops, and the eastern city of Liège, except for the fortified position of Liège, was taken following this. Only the northwestern part of the country was still under Belgian rule, and under command of King Albert.

Many Belgians sought to join the still active Belgian army. Others attempted to escape the country. For the inhabitants of Liège, roughly 30 kilometres (19 mi) from the Dutch border, this was generally done via Maastricht, in the Netherlands, which was neutral.

== Specifications ==
Some of the technical specifications include:

- length: 23.5 metres
- width: 5.5 metres
- height: 3.5 metres
- power: 35 HP

== Escape ==
Atlas V arrived at about midnight, at the wharf in the Coronmeuse section of Liège, in the north of the city, on the left bank of the Meuse. It ran silent, carried by the current through the populated localities of Herstal and Jupille without encumberment. Exiting the city, Atlas V was not discovered by the Germans until it was near Argenteau/Hermalle-under-Argenteau, where it was attacked by a motorboat. Moving at speed, she was able to sink the motorboat in her wake. Atlas V then proceeded at 45 km/h (28 mph), encountering heavy fire all along the river, lit by powerful lights. Later, the tugboat broke the railway bridge downstream of Visé, then tore off the electrified chain and wire which barred the river. It ran into a pontoon armed with machine guns and escaped from intense fire. It approached the right bank of the Meuse at Eisden in the Netherlands (opposite Ében-Émael) around one in the morning, with the sound of La Brabançonne playing and flying the Belgian flag to the wind.

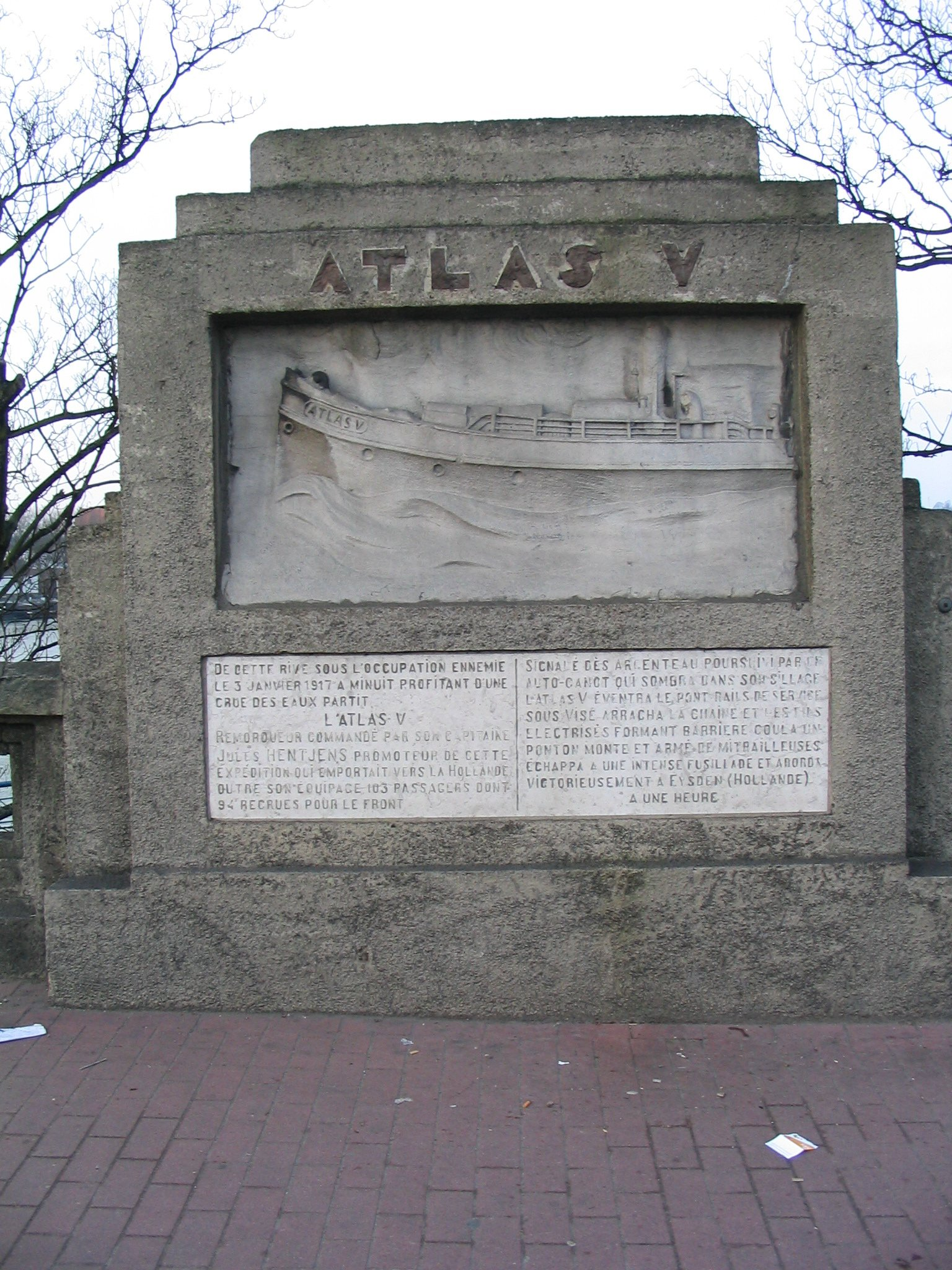
Plaque on the Pont Atlas, Liège

The boat was recovered by its owner in Liège four days later. The family of Jules Hentjens, suspected of assisting in the escape, were arrested and given long prison sentences.
