= Yerne =

Coordinates: 50°43′N 5°21′E

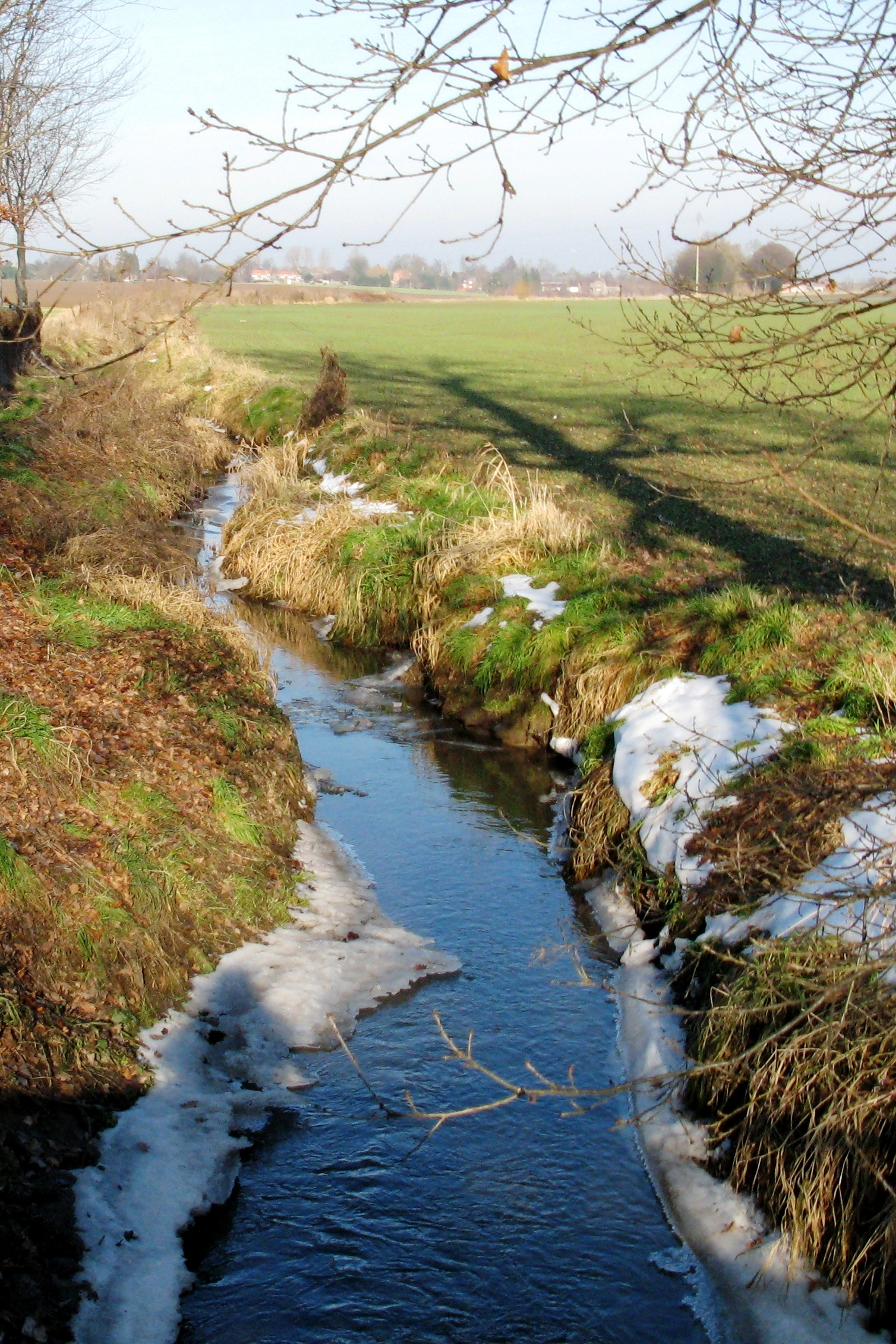

Location
- Country: Belgium

Physical characteristics
- Source
  - location: Liège Province
- Length: 15.5 km (9.6 mi)

Basin features
- Progression: Meuse→ North Sea

Yerne is a river in Belgium. It flows for 15.5 kilometres (9.6 mi) through the province of Liège between Yernawe and Lens-sur-Geer. The Yerne is a tributary of the Jeker and forms part of the Meuse basin.
