= List of protected heritage sites in Bassenge =

This table shows an overview of the protected heritage sites in the Walloon town Bassenge. This list is part of Belgium's national heritage.

Object	Year/architect	Town/section	Address	Coordinates	Number^{?}	Image
Toren van Eben-Ezer and site ^{(nl)} ^{(fr)}		Bassenge Eben-Emael		50.77617°N 5.64947°E	62011-CLT-0001-01 Info	Toren van Eben-Ezer en site
Site of "Lava-Heyoule" ^{(nl)} ^{(fr)}		Bassenge		50.781751°N 5.665995°E	62011-CLT-0002-01 Info	
Ancient tower of the old church of Saint-Victor de Glons ^{(nl)} ^{(fr)}		Bassenge		50.751198°N 5.546482°E	62011-CLT-0003-01 Info	Ongebruikte toren van de oude kerk Saint-Victor de Glons More images
Organs of the church of Saint-Victor ^{(nl)} ^{(fr)}		Bassenge		50.751251°N 5.546355°E	62011-CLT-0004-01 Info	
Tower of St-Lambert Church ^{(nl)} ^{(fr)}		Bassenge		50.769021°N 5.629624°E	62011-CLT-0005-01 Info	Kerk St-Lambert: toren More images
Site of "Thier à la tombe" ^{(nl)} ^{(fr)}		Bassenge	Eben-Emael	50.792176°N 5.672417°E	62011-CLT-0006-01 Info	
Tumulus of Emael and surroundings ^{(nl)} ^{(fr)}		Bassenge		50.789778°N 5.675463°E	62011-CLT-0007-01 Info	Tumulus van Emael, het ensemble van de tumulus met zijn omgeving More images
Presbytery Place Albert ^{(nl)} ^{(fr)}		Bassenge	place Albert	50.794229°N 5.667954°E	62011-CLT-0008-01 Info	Totaliteit van de pastorie place Albert
Saint-Laurent farmhouse ^{(nl)} ^{(fr)}		Bassenge	rue St-Laurent n°185	50.753601°N 5.540932°E	62011-CLT-0010-01 Info	Boerderij Saint-Laurent

== See also ==
- List of protected heritage sites in Liège (province)
