= Château Neercanne =

Restaurant in Maastricht, the Netherlands

Coordinates: 50°49′7.98″N 5°40′4.55″E

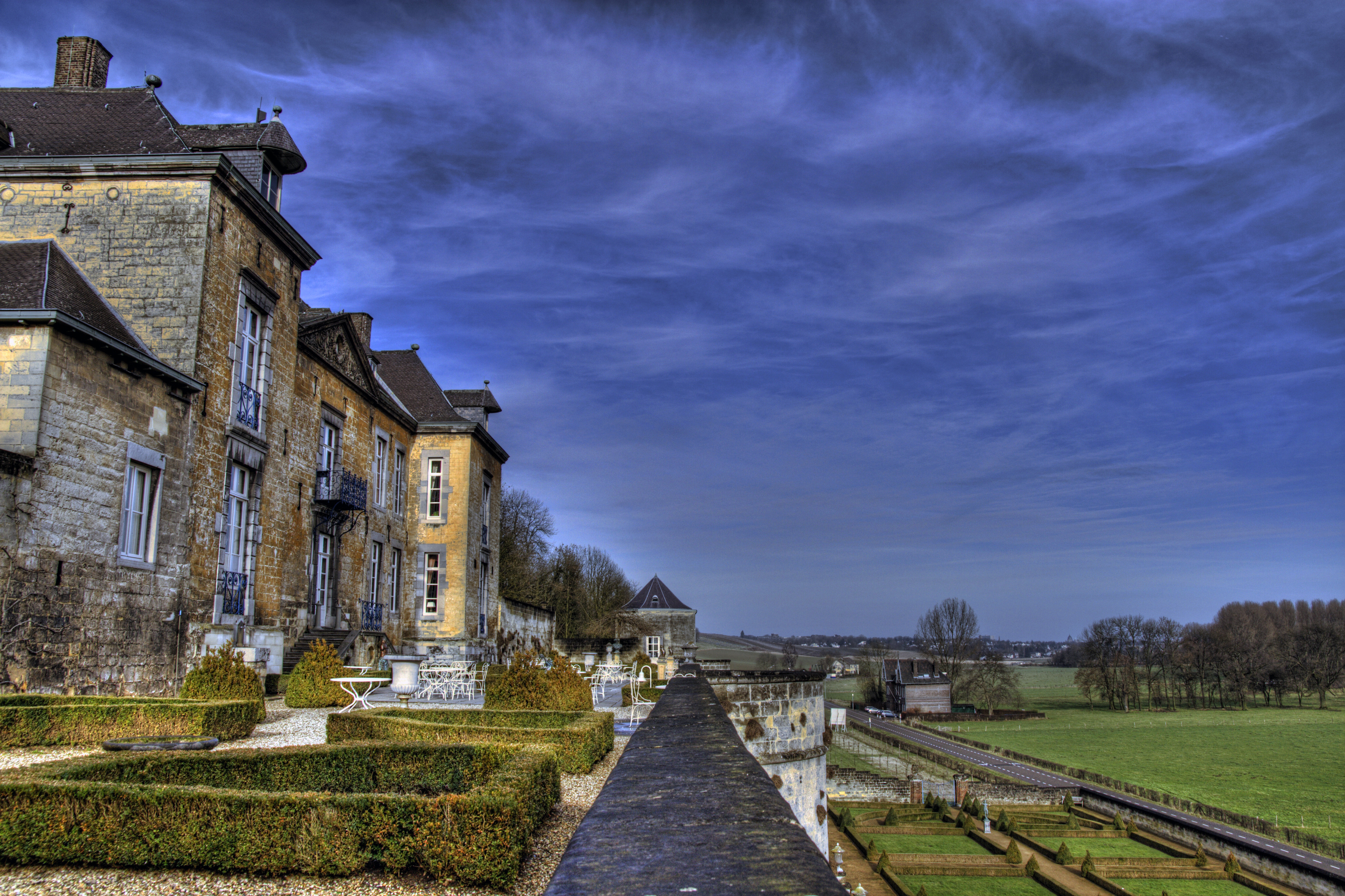
- Château Neercanne in 2009
- Interactive map of Château Neercanne

Restaurant information
- Head chef: Robert Levels
- Food type: French
- Rating: Michelin Guide
- Location: Von Dopfflaan 10, 6213 NG Maastricht, Maastricht, 6213 ND, Netherlands
- Seating capacity: 60
- Website: website

Château Neercanne (also known as Agimont or kasteel Neercanne) is a restaurant located in Maastricht in the Netherlands. It is a fine dining restaurant that was awarded one or two Michelin stars in the periods 1957-1982 and 1986–2018.

In 2013, GaultMillau awarded them 16.0 points (out of 20).

Head chef in the Michelin period, were, amongst others, Theo Koch and Ber Stassen. Present head chef is Robert Levels.

== Building ==
The castle is located just north of the Belgian village of Kanne, south of Maastricht but still on Dutch territory.

It is built on a site that was already in use by the Romans. The caves, created by mining blocks to build the fortifications, still exist. They are now in use as the wine cellar of Neercanne.

In 1465 the castle was destroyed by the people of Liège during the Liège Wars. The outbuildings and the prominent corner tower were built in 1611, in the Mosan style.

The main building was built in 1698 by Daniël Wolf van Dopff, lord of Neercanne, at that time the military governor of Maastricht. All present buildings are built from marl.

In the valley in front of the castle flows the river Jeker and is a baroque garden, reconstructed to the original design.

== Star history ==
- 1957-1966: one star
- 1967-1977: two stars
- 1978-1982: one star
- 1986–2018: one star
- 2023-now: one star

== Head chefs with Michelin stars ==
Mentioned periods are the proven periods they carried a Michelin star
- 1952-1965: Theo Koch
- 1965-1966: H.P.J. (Bèr) Stassen
- 1967-1978: Gustave van Mieghem
- 1980–2017: Hans Snijders

== See also ==
- List of Michelin starred restaurants in the Netherlands
- List of castles in the Netherlands
