= Bassenge =

Municipality in Liège Province, Wallonia, Belgium

Bassenge: Bassindje (Walloon); Bitsingen (Dutch)
- Municipality
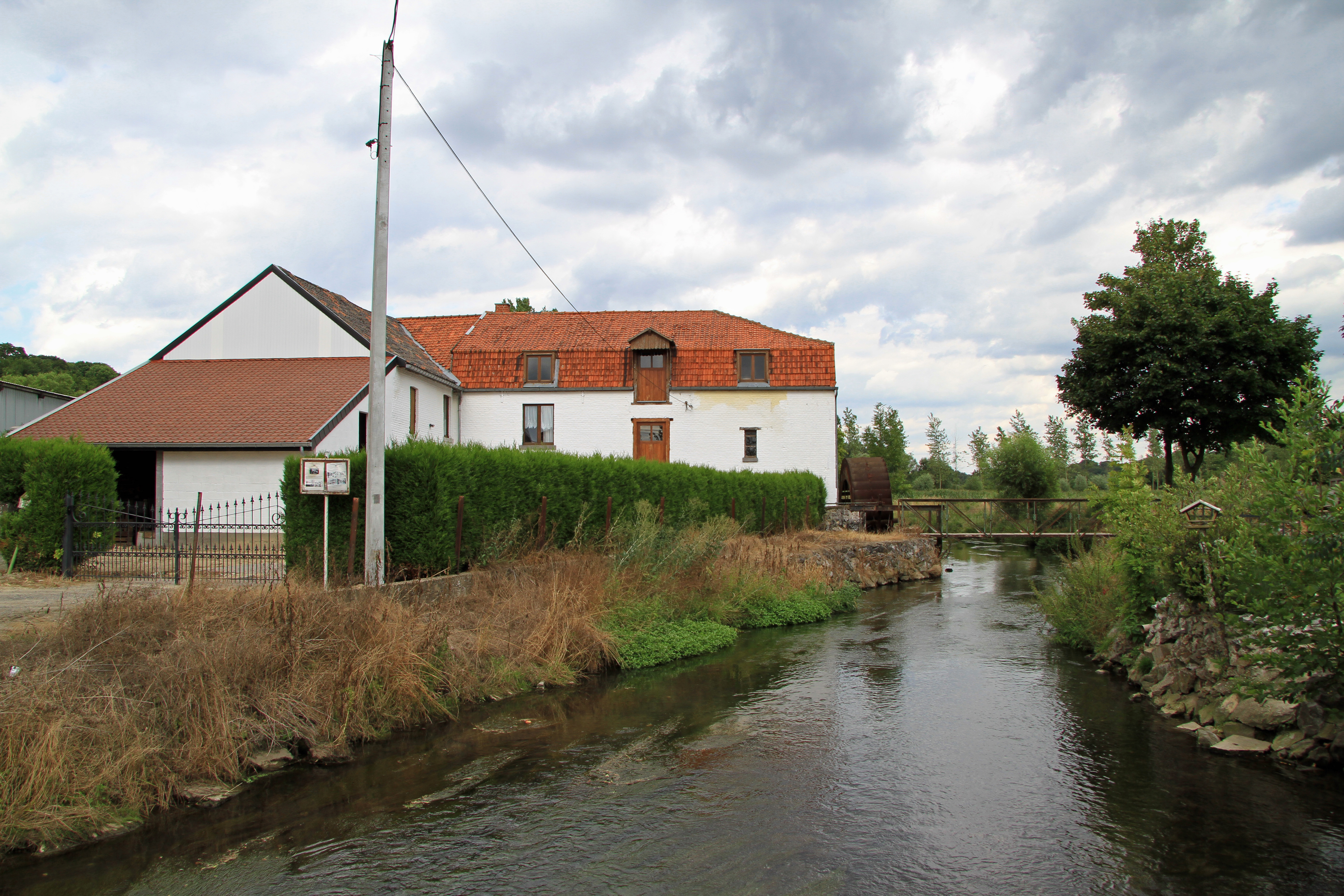

- Flag Coat of arms

- Location of Bassenge in Liège province
- Interactive map of Bassenge
- Location in Belgium
- Coordinates: 50°46′N 05°36′E
- Country: Belgium
- Community: French Community
- Region: Wallonia
- Province: Liège
- Arrondissement: Liège

Government
  - Mayor: Valérie Hiance
  - Governing party: Bassenge Demain (CDH/MR)

Area
  - Total: 38.21 km^{2} (14.75 sq mi)

Population (2018-01-01)
  - Total: 8,986
  - Density: 235.2/km^{2} (609.1/sq mi)
- Postal codes: 4690
- NIS code: 62011
- Area codes: 04
- Website: www.bassenge.be

Bassenge (French pronunciation: [basɑ̃ʒ]; Dutch: Bitsingen, Dutch pronunciation: [ˈbɪtsɪŋə(n)]; Walloon: Bassindje) is a municipality of Wallonia located in the province of liège, Belgium.

On 1 January 2006 Bassenge had a total population of 8,335. The total area is 38.17 km^{2} which gives a population density of 218 inhabitants per km^{2}.

The municipality consists of the following districts: Bassenge, Boirs, Ében-Émael, Glons, Roclenge-sur-Geer, and Wonck.

== Gallery ==
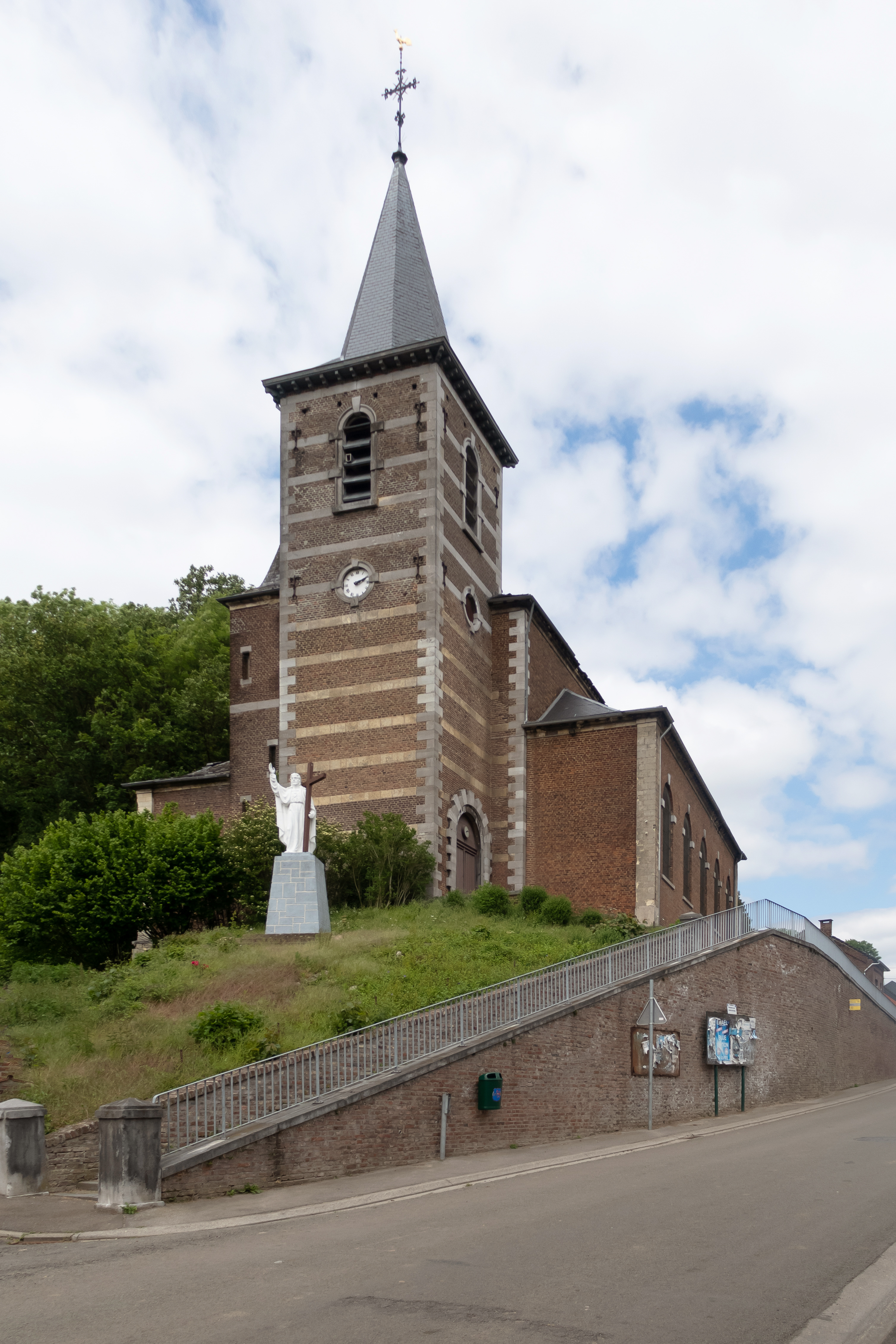
Bassenge, church: l'église Saint-Pierre

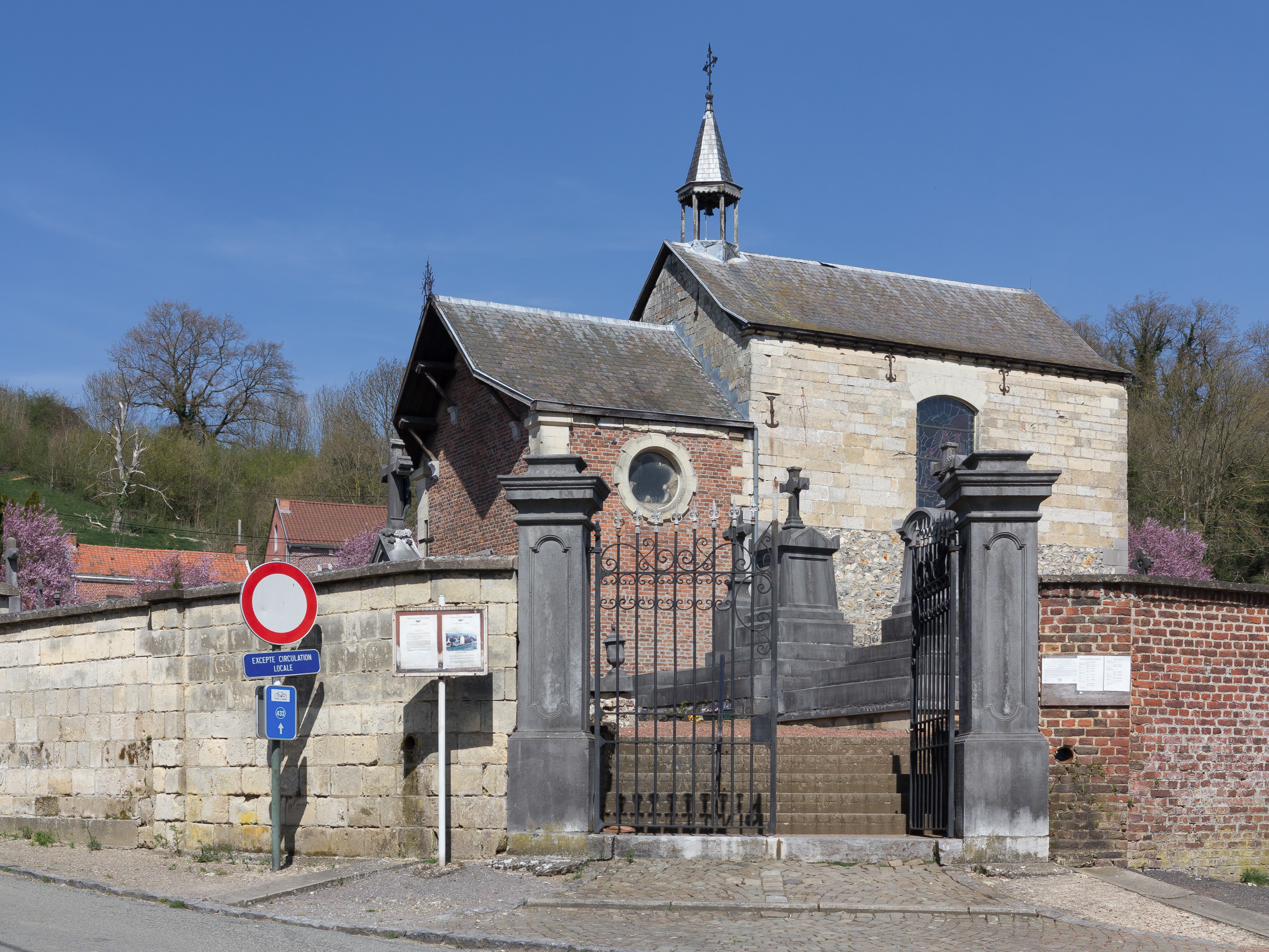
Bassenge, la chapelle du Vi Mosti

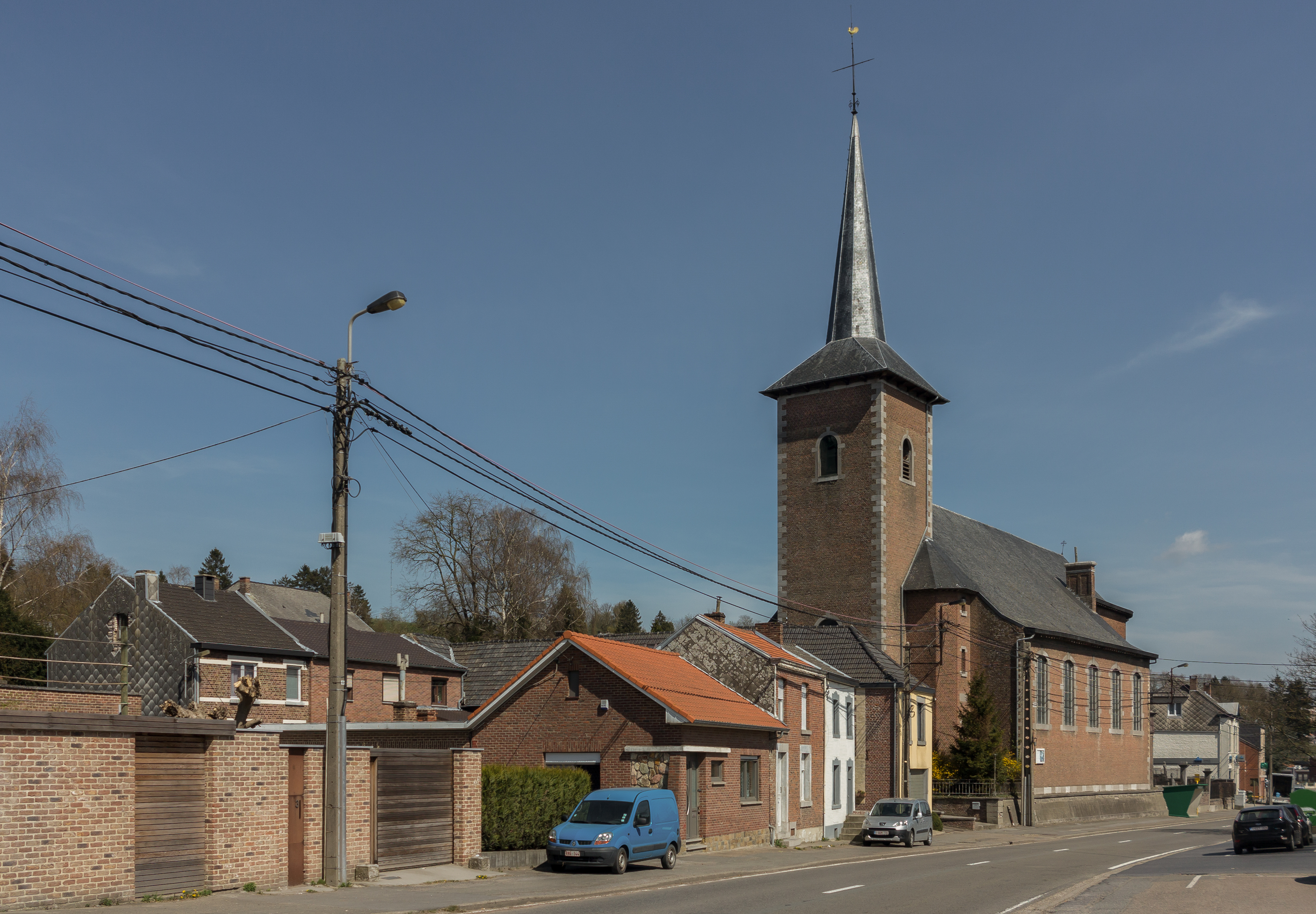
Roclenge sur Geer, l'église Saint-Remy

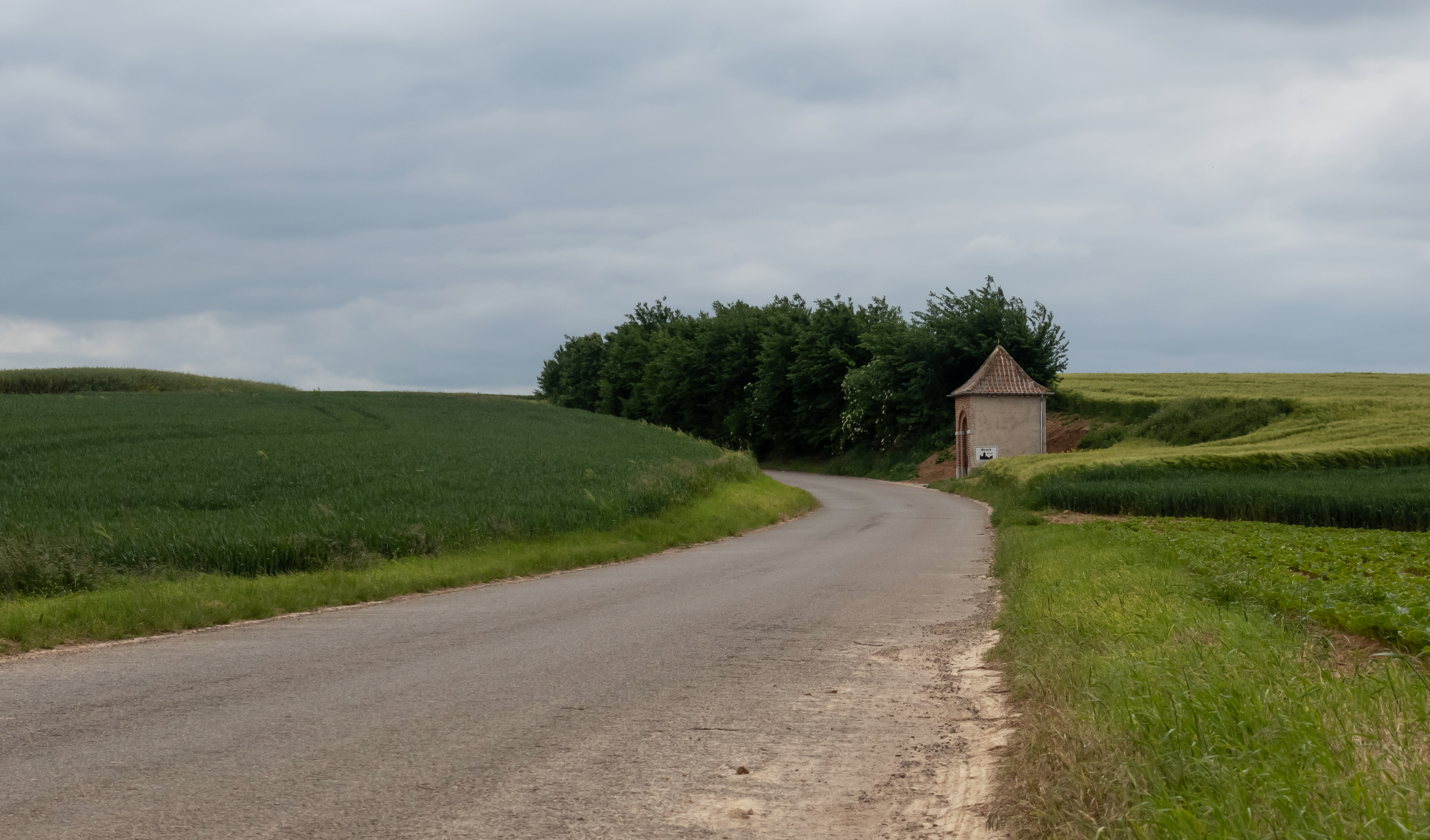
Wonck, chapel in the hills

== Historic sites ==
- Fort Eben-Emael was a major fortress intended to defend Belgium against attack from Germany. Built in the 1930s, it was swiftly captured by German forces in May 1940 during the Belgian Campaign of the Second World War.
- Eben-Ezer Tower, also known as le musée du silex (the museum of flint) is a fantastical tower built of flint rubble in the 1960s by Robert Garcet and decorated with mystical and religious symbols.
- Wonck Airfield was a small runway for ultralight aviation in use by Aeroclub Bassange. It closed around 2006.

== See also ==
- List of protected heritage sites in Bassenge
