= Wonck Airfield =

Former aerodrome in Wallonia, Belgium

- IATA: none; ICAO: EBBW

Summary
- Airport type: Public
- Serves: Bassenge
- Location: Wallonia, Belgium
- Elevation AMSL: 367 ft (112 m)
- Coordinates: 50°46′35.2″N 5°36′46.1″E

Map
- Location of Wonck Airfield in Belgium

Runways
| Direction | Length | | Surface |
| Direction | ft | m | Surface |
|---|---|---|---|
| 05/23 | 800 | 244 | Grass |
- Source: Landings.com

Wonck Airfield (ICAO: EBBW) was a public use aerodrome located near Bassenge, Liège, Wallonia, Belgium. It was home to aeroclub Bassenge. It closed in 2005 or 2006.

== See also ==
- List of airports in Belgium
