= De la Générosité =

Prussian chivalric order

Ordre de la générosité
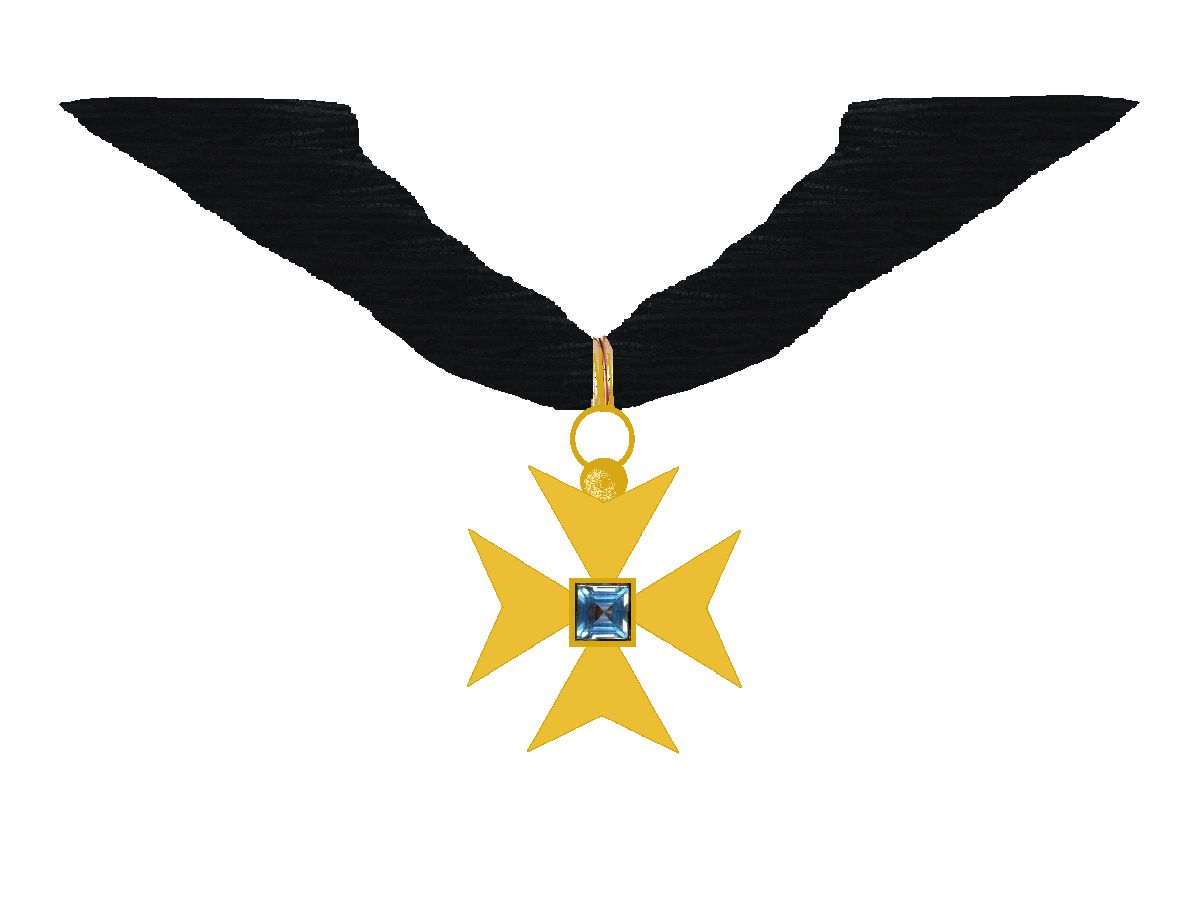
- The original 1667 insignia
- Type: Order of Merit
- Established: 1667
- Country: Brandenburg-Prussia; Kingdom of Prussia
- Ribbon
- Status: extant
- Founder: Frederick I of Prussia

Statistics
- First induction: 1667
- Last induction: 1791

Precedence
- Next (higher): Order of the Black Eagle
- Related: Order of the Red Eagle; Pour le Mérite

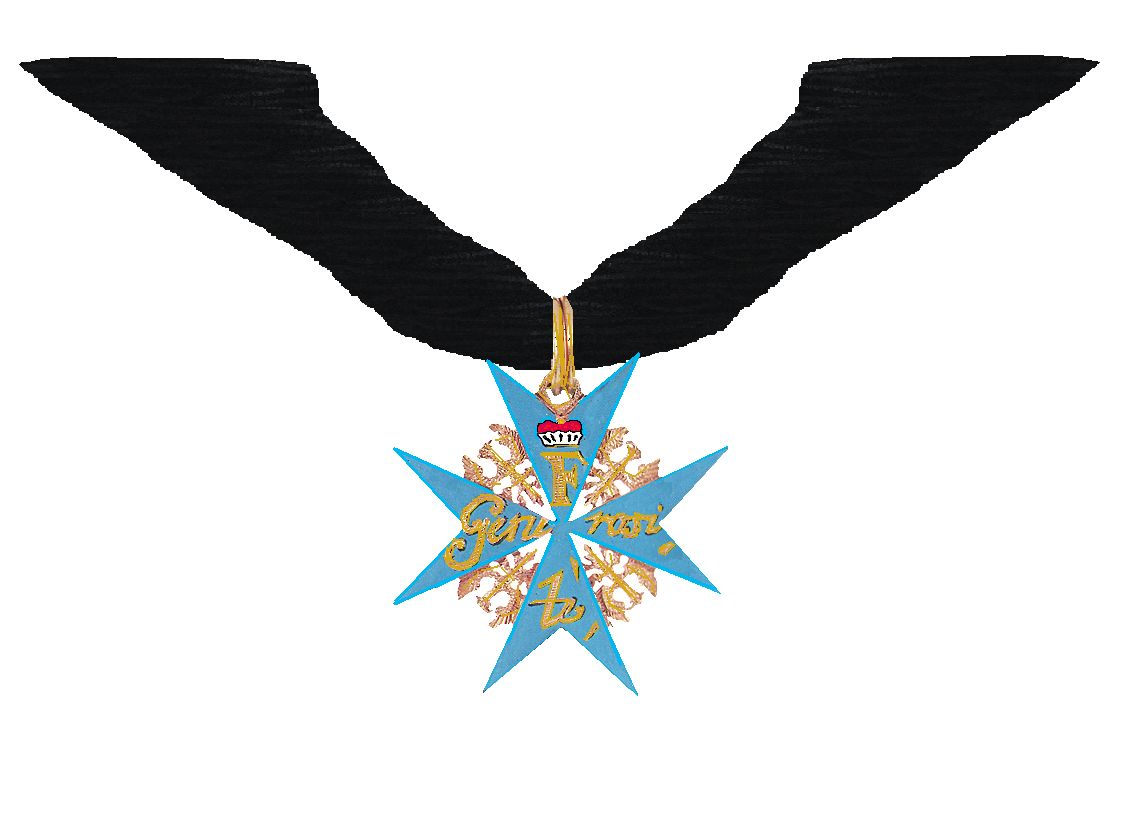
The second format of insignia for De la Générosité

The Ordre de la Générosité (Order of Generosity) was a chivalric order of the Kingdom of Prussia, established in 1667 by the nine-year-old crown prince Frederick of Brandenburg, later Frederick I of Prussia. It was also known in German as Für Edelmut (For Generosity) or the Gnadenkreuz (literally Grace Cross). The Order's jewel consisted of a gemstone in a small golden cross, later with the inscription "générosité".

When first set up it had no statutes or constitution, though its guiding principle was that its members should live "generously in all things". Under Frederick William I of Prussia the Order was mainly awarded as a reward for good service in recruiting the Langen Kerls. It was the second highest of the Prussian orders after the Order of the Black Eagle. In June 1740, immediately after his accession, Frederick the Great took over the format, shape and colours of the order for his new Pour le Mérite order, though De la Générosité continued to be sporadically awarded to foreigners until 1791.
