= Itteren =

Itteren Ittere
- Town
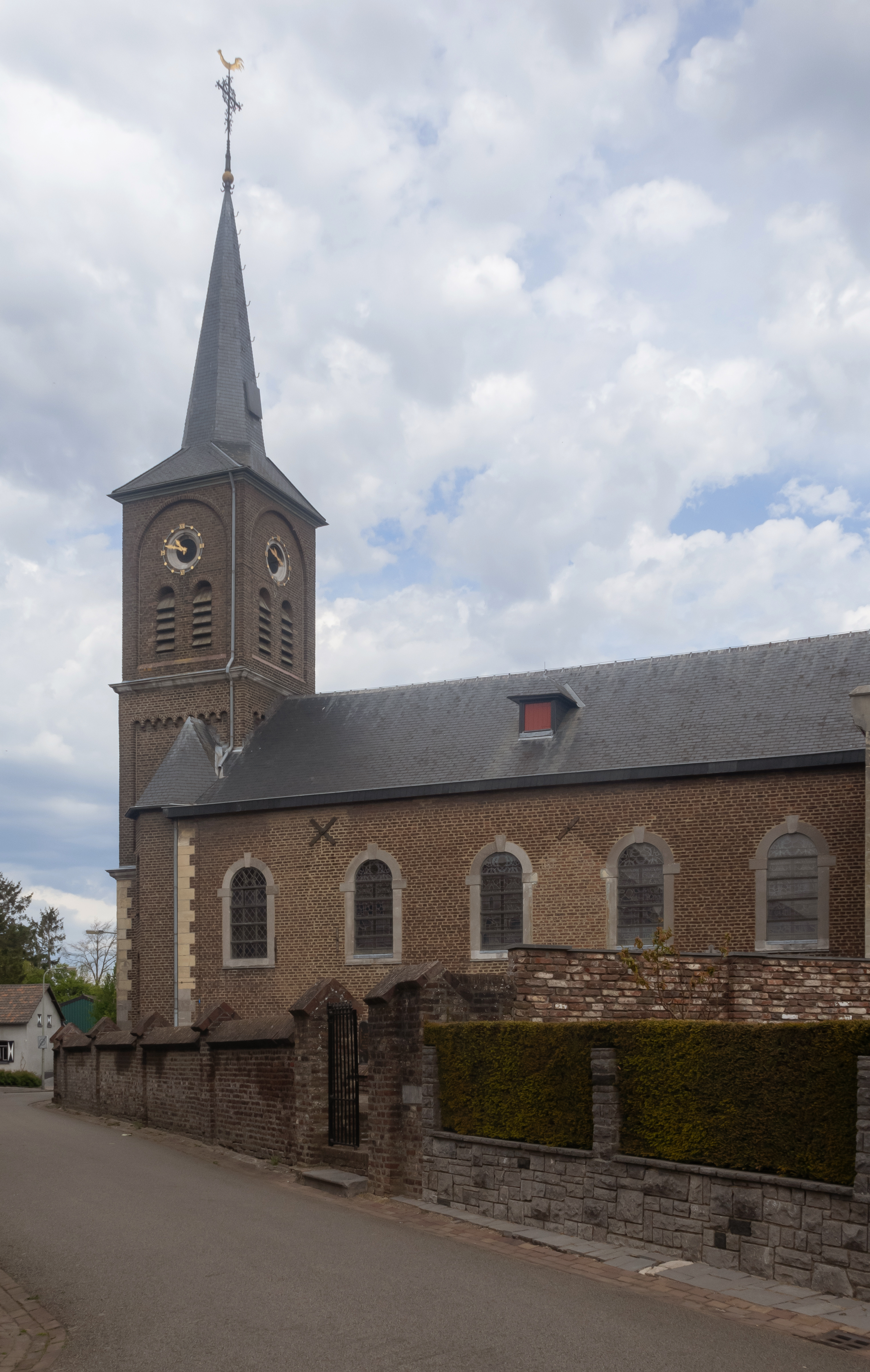
- Itteren, church: Sint-Martinuskerk
- Interactive map of Itteren
- Coordinates: 50°54′N 5°42′E
- Country: Netherlands
- Province: Limburg (Netherlands)
- Municipality: Maastricht

Population (2001)
  - Total: 977

Itteren (Limburgish: Ittere) is a town in the Dutch province of Limburg. It is a part of the municipality of Maastricht, and lies about 6 km north of Maastricht.

Itteren was a separate municipality until 1970, when it was merged with Maastricht.

In 2001, Itteren had 977 inhabitants. The built-up area of the town was 0.25 km², and contained 396 residences.
