= EzerNet =

Latvian telecommunication company

- Company type: Limited Company
- Industry: Telecommunications and Internet access
- Founded: 1999
- Headquarters: Liepāja, Latvia

EzerNet Ltd. was a wireless and cable Internet service provider in Latvia, offering FTTH, MVDS, (pre-)WiMax and satellite access. In 2009 the company went bankrupt. EzerNet was a holder of 42 GHz frequency licence in Latvia.
