= Nancy Ezer =

Hebrew scholar, author, and lecturer (1947–2022)

- נַנְסִי עֶזֶר
- Born: October 16, 1947
- Died: January 31, 2022 (aged 74); New York, U.S.
- Education: Tel Aviv University, University of California, Los Angeles
- Occupations: Instructor, author
- Writing career
- Genre: Hebrew literature
- Notable works: Literature and Ideology

Nancy Ezer (Hebrew: נַנְסִי עֶזֶר) was a scholar, critic of Hebrew literature, author, and Senior Lecturer in Hebrew in the Department of Near Eastern Languages and Cultures at the University of California, Los Angeles.

== Education ==
She earned her B.A. from Tel Aviv University as well as a teaching certificate. She received her master's degree in 1983 and her PhD in Hebrew literature, also from UCLA in 1987.

== Teaching Experience ==
Ezer taught at UCLA from 1987 until her retirement in 2021. She offered courses in all levels of Hebrew and was conferred the Distinguished Teaching Award in 2007. Ezer was also recognized in 2008 by the UCLA Office of Instructional Development for her technological achievement in successfully creating an electronic Hebrew workbook to facilitate the assimilation of the Hebrew language. In addition to her native Hebrew, she was also fluent in English and Arabic and had a working knowledge of French and Yiddish. Ezer was a member of the National Association of Professors of Hebrew, and since 2005, she served as the Book Review Editor of Hebrew Higher Education.

== Publications ==
- Workbook Hebrew 1ABC, Academic Publishing Service, UCLA, 1987
- Literature and Ideology, Papyrus Publishing House at Tel Aviv University, Israel, 1992
- From the Melancholy of an Individual to the Melancholy of a Social Class: From Brenner’s Breakdown and Bereavement to Shabtai’s Past Continuous, Dappim Research in Literature, Haifa University, Israel, 2002
- Flirtation in S.Y. Agnon's Shira, History and Literature: New Readings of Jewish Texts in Honor of Arnold J. Band, ed. William Cutter and David C. Jacobson, Brown Judaic Studies, Brown University Press, Providence, 2002
- Rena Lee's Stories Collection: Far From Home, Hadoar, V. 82, 2, New York, 2003
- Allegory and Simulacra in Yuval Simoni's 'The Art of War', Iton 77, V. 288, Israel, 2004
- Ideology, Melancholy and Postmodern Irony in Itzhak Laor's The People, Food Fit for a King, Alpayim, Israel, 2005
- Black Humor and the Grotesque in Yitzhak Laor's Novel Ecce Homo, Alei-Siah, Hakibbutz Hameuchad Publishing House, Israel, 2007
- Mother Daughter Dialectics: Socialization of Survival in David Grossman's novel The Book of Internal Grammar, Hador, The Hebrew Annual of America, V.2., 2008
- The Terror Within and the Pagan Discourse: Yitzhak Laor's Postmodern Satire And With My Spirit, My Corpse, Jerusalem Studies in Hebrew Literature, V. 22, The Magnes Press, The Hebrew University, Israel, 2008
- Beyond the Stereotypes of Old Age: Women and Aging in Joshua Kenaz's Novel The Way to the Cats, Hador, The Hebrew Annual of America, V.3., 2009
- From Text to Context: The Reader and the Signification Process in Yuval Shimoni's A Room, Ma'ase Sipur, Bar-Ilan University Press, Israel, 2009
- Hebrew Electronic Workbook: Rigorous Grammar Practice Outside the Classroom, Hebrew Higher Education, Published at the University of Wisconsin-Madison by the National Association of Professors of Hebrew in Institutions of Higher Learning, V. 13., 2010
- Depression and Melancholia in Brenner's Breakdown and Bereavement, Hador, The Hebrew Annual of America, V.4., 2011
- Between Comic Terror and Jewish Humor: Yitzhak Laor's As Much as You Give Me, Collection of Essays on Yitzhak Laor's Work, Hakibbutz Hameuchad Publishing House, Israel, 2011

Her various articles examine Modern and Post-Modern Hebrew novels, interrogating their rhetorical treatments of the Zionist meta-narrative and their conceptualization of an Israeli identity through various genres and literary modes.
