= Eben-Ezer Tower =

Coordinates: 50°46′34″N 5°38′58″E

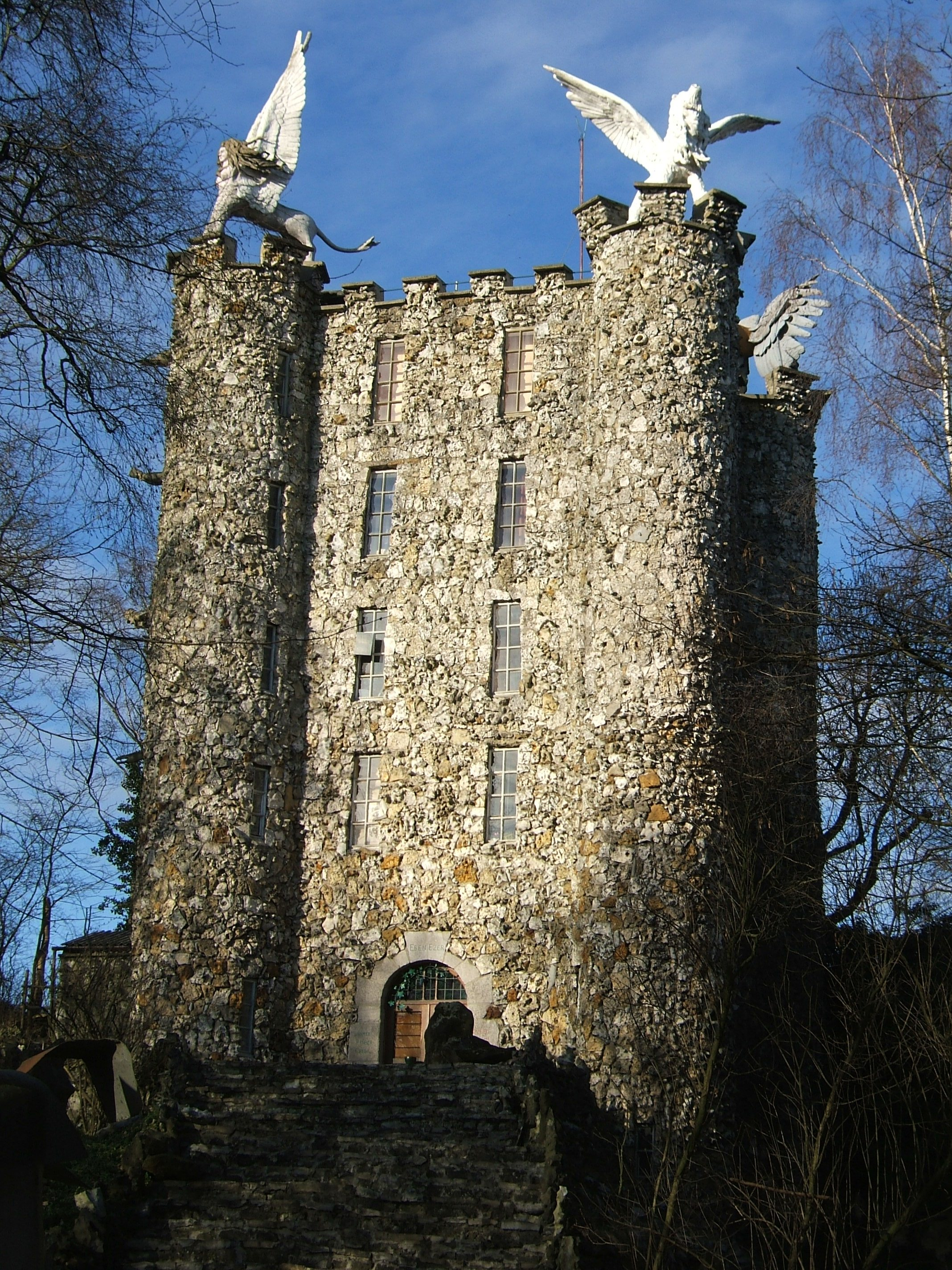
Eben-Ezer Tower from the south

Eben-Ezer Tower, also known as the Museum of Flint (French: Musée du Silex), is a tower and museum in Eben-Emael, in the municipality of Bassenge in eastern Belgium.

== Builder ==
The tower was built by Robert Garcet (1912–2001), born in Mons, Belgium. At age 18 he moved to the Jeker river area between Liège and Maastricht, working as a laborer in the area quarries, later becoming owner of a flint quarry.

His autodidact interests included pacifism, biblical studies, geology, nature, and history. He wrote books on his personal opinion of the creation of man.

Around 1948, Garcet began a tower, as an appeal for world peace, and in 1951 he was building, the 108-foot flint stone tower, with the occasional help of others, completing in 1963.

== Building ==
The tower is a fantastical construction built of flint rubble, and with dimensions and symbolism taken from the bible and from ancient civilisations.

The tower is conspicuously topped at its four corners by large stone sculptures of the four cherubim of the Apocalypse, consisting of: a bull on the north-west turret, man, in the form of a sphinx in the south-west, a lion in the south-east and an eagle at the north-east corner.

Some of the seven floors of the tower are open to the public. The first few levels, the 'museum of flint', explain the history and use of the stone.

== In media ==
As a work of outsider architecture, the tower was featured in episode 3 of Jarvis Cocker's 1999 series, Journeys into The Outside. Cocker visited the tower and interviewed Robert Garcet.
