= Kanne =

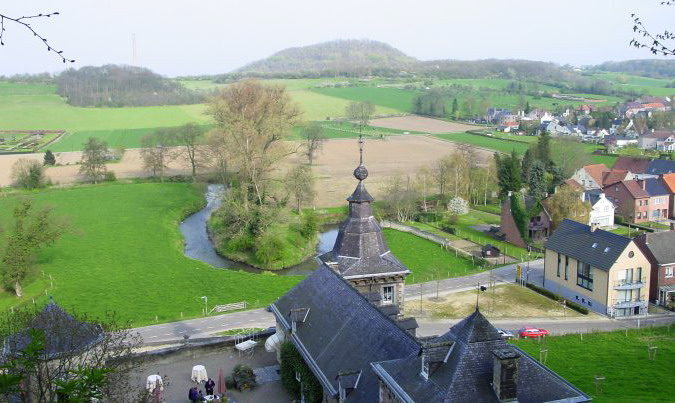
- Interactive map of Kanne
- Coordinates: 50°48′49″N 5°40′27″E
- Country: Belgium
- Region: Flanders
- Province: Limburg
- Arrondissement: Tongeren
- Municipality: Riemst
- Founded: 965 (first mentioned)

Area
  - Total: 3.63 km^{2} (1.40 sq mi)

Population (2021)
  - Total: 1,162
- Time zone: CET (UTC+1)
  - Summer (DST): CEST (UTC+2)

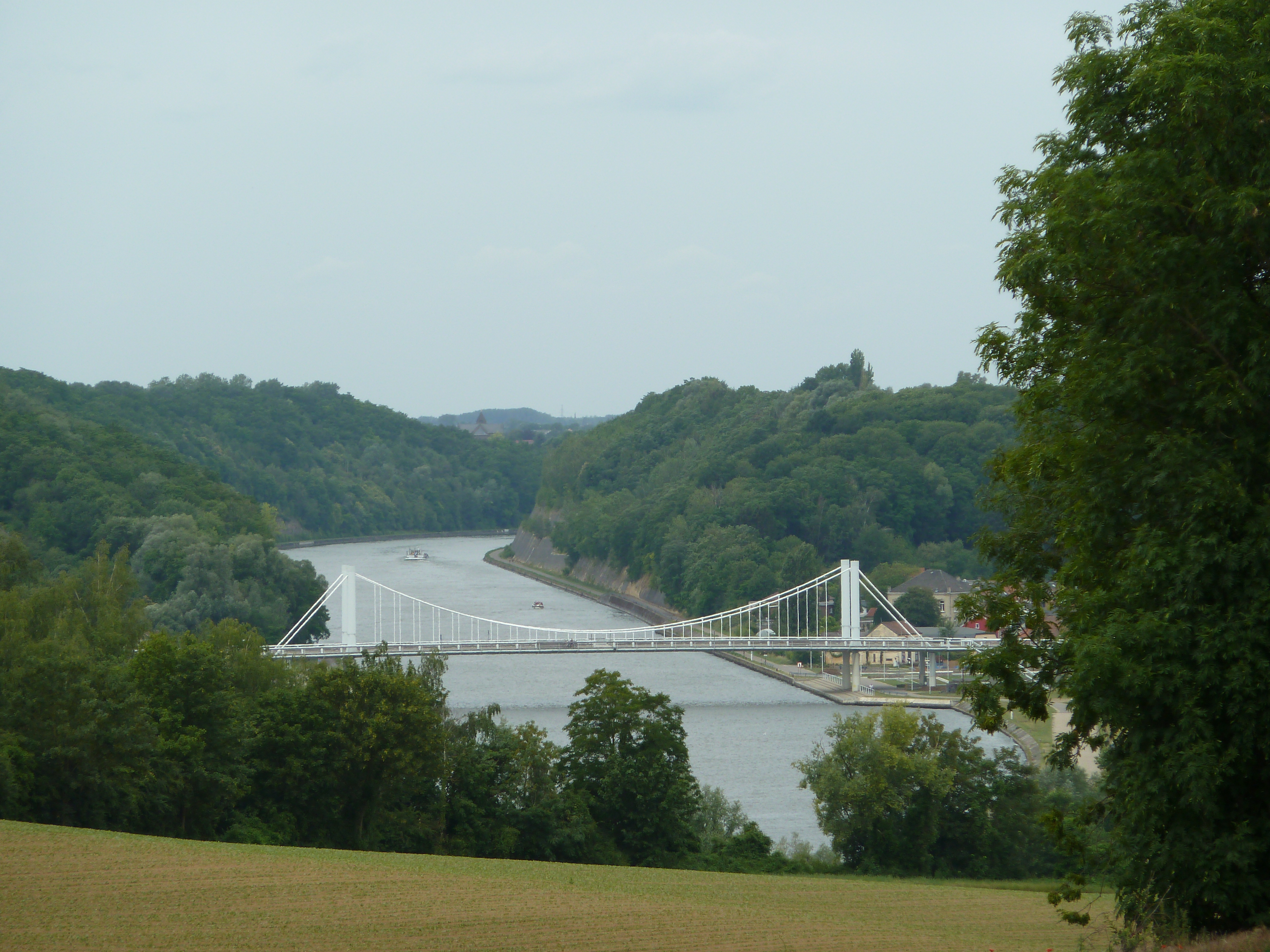
Bridge over the Albert Canal, as seen from Mount Saint Peter

Kanne (Limburgish: Kan) is a village in the municipality of Riemst in the southeastern part of the Belgian province of Limburg. As of 2021, the village has 1,162 inhabitants, a significant number of whom have Dutch nationality.

== Location ==
Kanne is situated right on the border with the city of Maastricht in the Dutch province of Limburg. It is also on the border with the Walloon municipality of Visé. Kanne is situated in the valley of the river Geer (Dutch: Jeker) between Cannerberg (part of the Hesbaye Plateau) in the west and Mount Saint Peter (Caestert Plateau) in the east. The village is also situated on the Albert Canal, at the western end of the canal's passage through Mount Saint Peter.

== History ==
The name Kanne ("Cannes") was mentioned first in a document of 965. In 1079 it was referred to as apud Kanne. The meaning of the name is not known.

Kanne consists of two parts: Opkanne ("Upper Kanne") and Neercanne ("Lower Kanne"). Opkanne belonged in 965 to the chapter of Saint Martin's church in Liège. In 1391 the Van den Bosch family owned Opkanne. Their castle in Opkanne, Castle Harff, stood near present-day Bovenstraat. In 1486 Gijs (Guy) van den Bosch, lord of Opkanne and a companion of William I de La Marck, was murdered by an angry mob in Liège. Neercanne was always privately owned. From 1794 till 1843 the two parts of Kanne were briefly united, but they were separated again as a result of the Treaty of London (1839).

Situated close to Maastricht, which was besieged many times, Kanne was often a battleground. In the 1930s, along with the construction of the Albert Canal, an important military fortress was built near Kanne, Fort Eben-Emael. In May 1940, at the beginning of World War II, 217 Belgian soldiers died here when they tried to stop the German invaders as part of the Battle of Belgium.

== Sights ==
A major historical monument in Kanne is Château Neercanne, although technically it is not in Kanne but a few meters across the border in Maastricht, the Netherlands. The meaning of the name Neercanne is "lower Kanne", as it is situated lower, downstream from the river. The castle with terraced gardens was built in 1698 by Daniël Wolf baron van Dopff, at that time military governor of Maastricht. The small baroque chapel of the Holy Sepulchre was built in 1647. The village's parish church, dedicated to Saint Hubert, was built in 1938, but the tower dates from the 15th or 16th century. There are two historic watermills on the river Geer in Kanne. A sinister reminder of World War II is the Eben-Emael fortress, constructed in 1931–35 to protect the Belgian border near the Albert Canal.

== Gallery ==
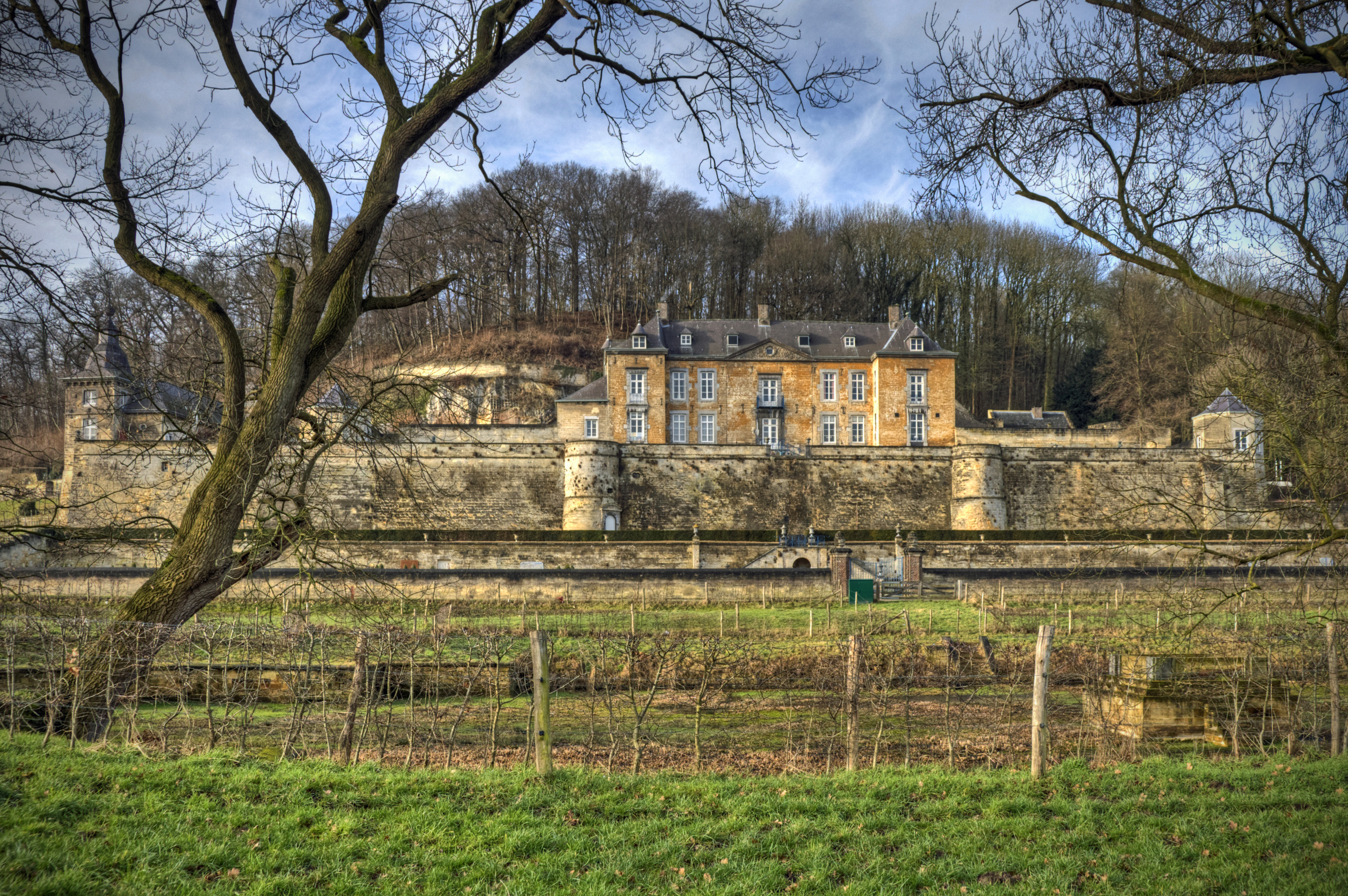
Château Neercanne in Maastricht, near Kanne

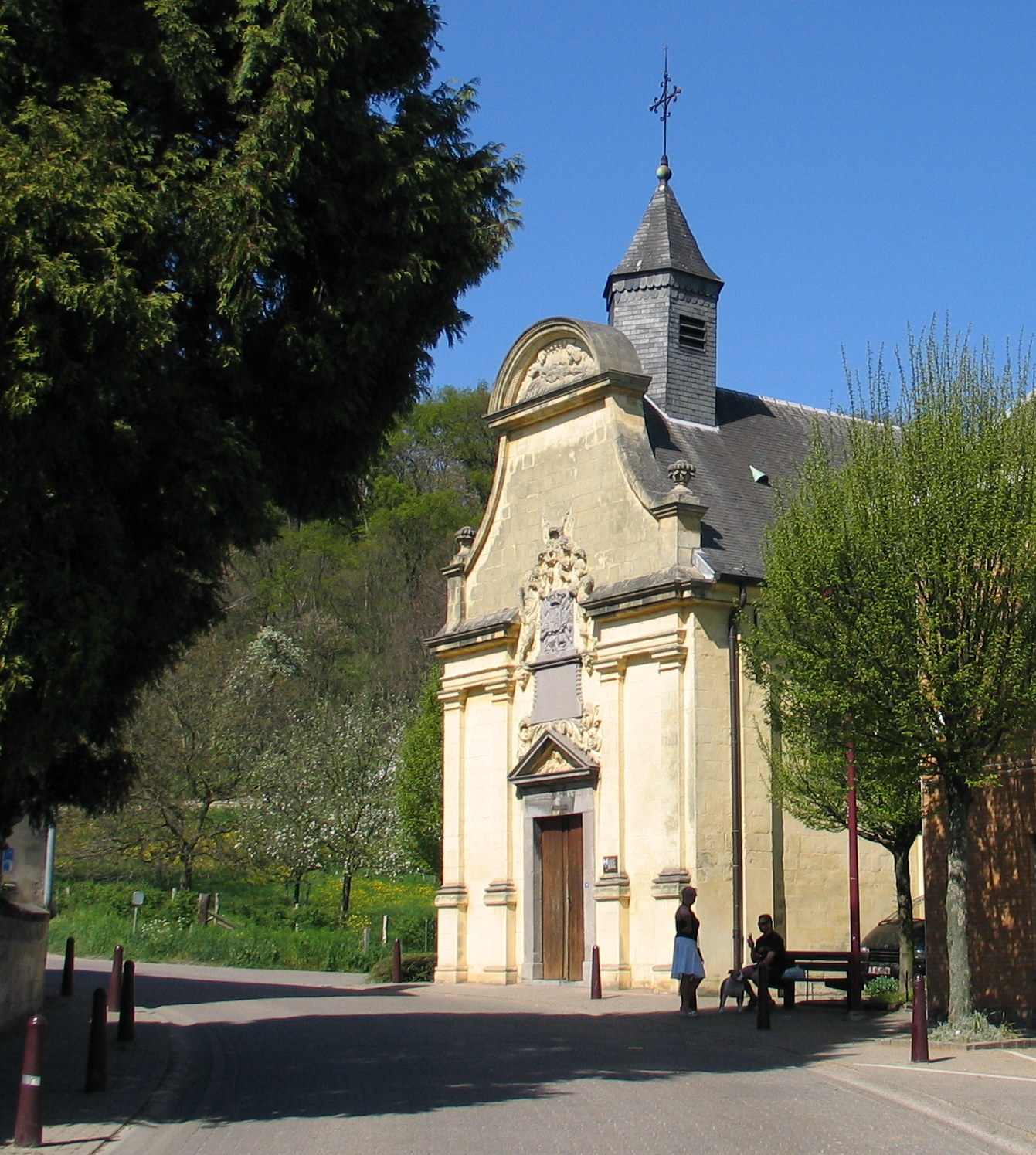
Chapel of the Holy Sepulchre

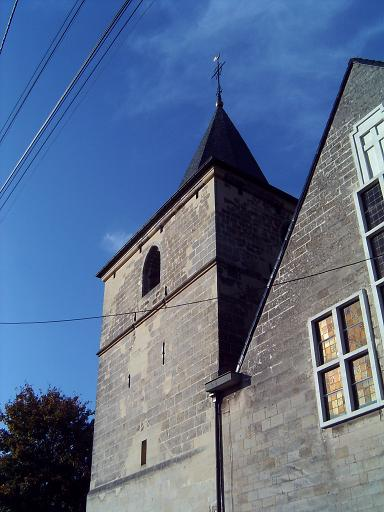
Church of Saint Hubert

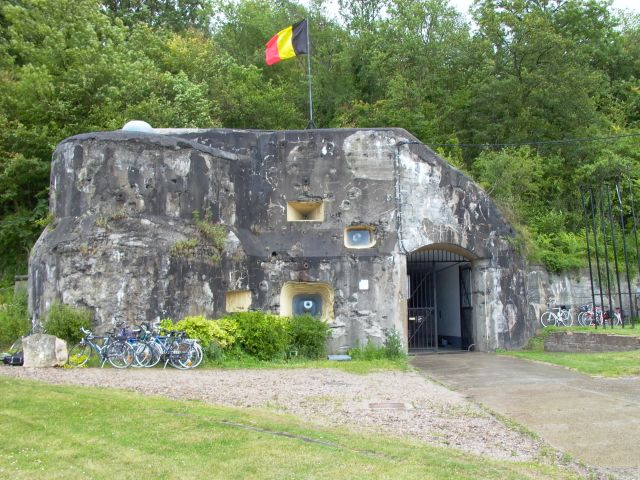
Fortress Eben-Emael
