= Jeker =

Tributary of the Meuse through Belgium and Netherlands

Jeker Geer
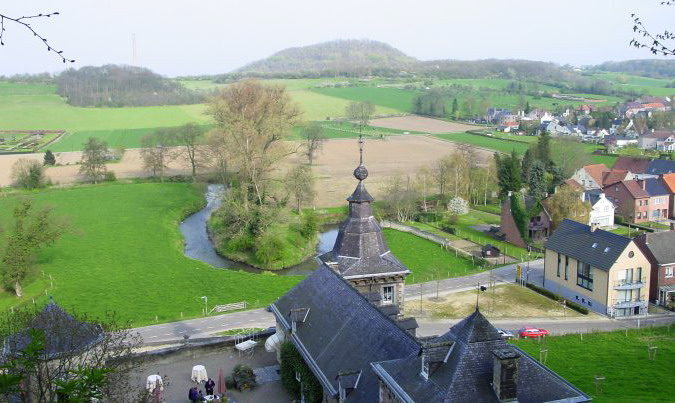
- Jeker river at Kanne (Belgium), near Château Neercanne

Location
- Country: Belgium, Netherlands

Physical characteristics
- Source
  - location: near Geer, Liège
- Mouth
  - location: Meuse in Maastricht
  - coordinates: 50°50′45″N 5°41′48″E
- Length: 54 km (34 mi)

Basin features
- Progression: Meuse→ North Sea
- Tributaries
  - right: Yerne

The Jeker (Dutch pronunciation: [ˈjeːkər]; French: Geer, French pronunciation: [ʒɛʁ]) is a river in Belgium and in the Netherlands. It is a left-bank tributary to the river Meuse. The source of the Jeker is near the village of Geer, in the Belgian province of Liège. The river is approximately 54 kilometres (34 mi) long, of which about 50 kilometres (31 mi) is in Belgium (provinces of Liège and Limburg) and 4 kilometres (2.5 mi) in the Netherlands (province of Limburg), where it flows into the river Meuse at Maastricht (Netherlands).

Places through which the Jeker passes include Waremme, Tongeren, Kanne, (all three in Belgium) and Maastricht.

== Recreational aspect ==
Rafting on the Jeker is an entertaining recreational activity. Beginning in Kanne, it is possible to raft into the city of Maastricht on this relaxing river. The water flow is best in mid-autumn and spring. Obstacles may be present when the water is low. The trip from Kanne to Maastricht takes about two hours and crosses the border between Belgium and the Netherlands.

== Gallery ==
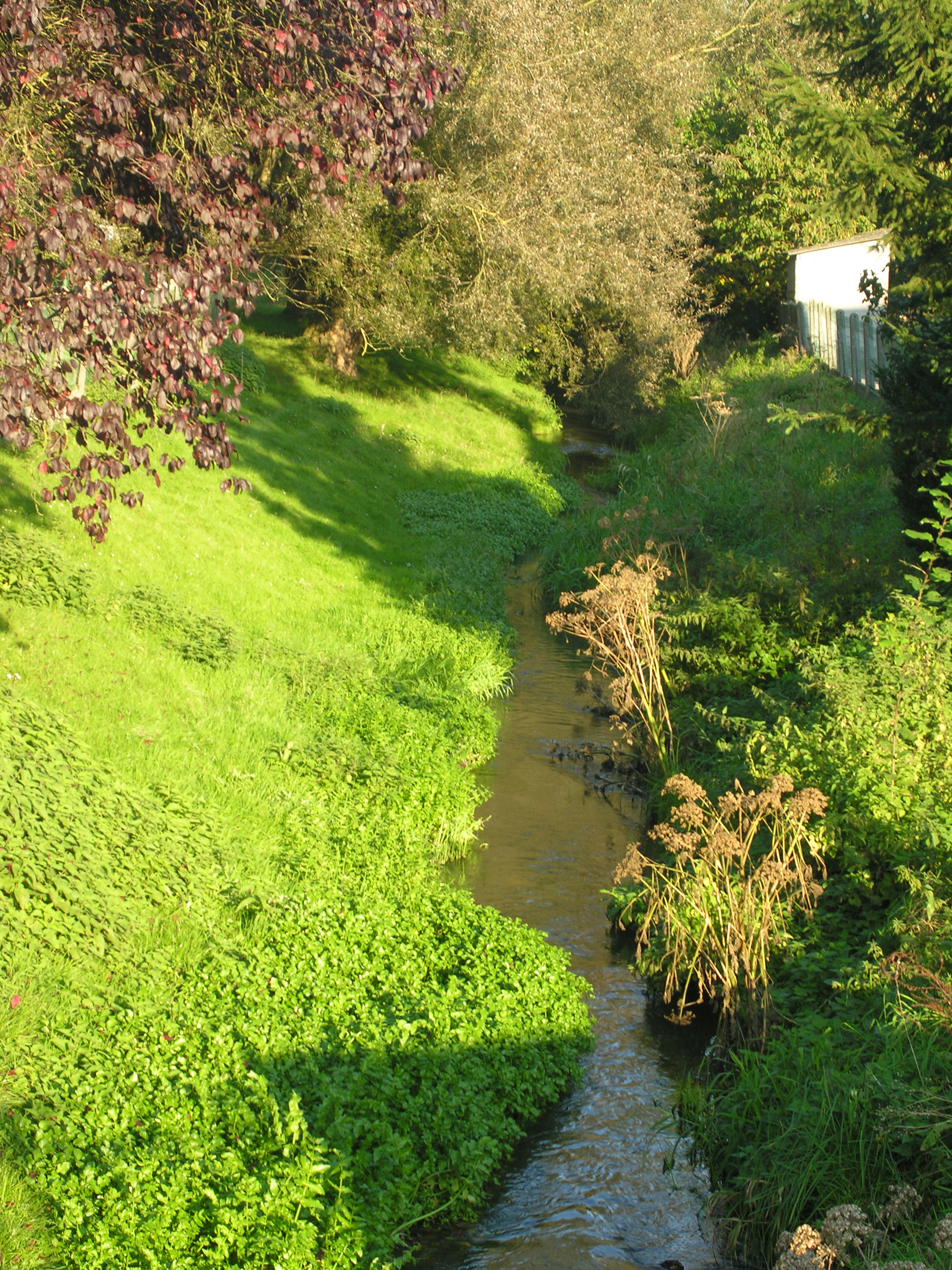
Jeker river at Hollogne-sur-Geer (Belgium)

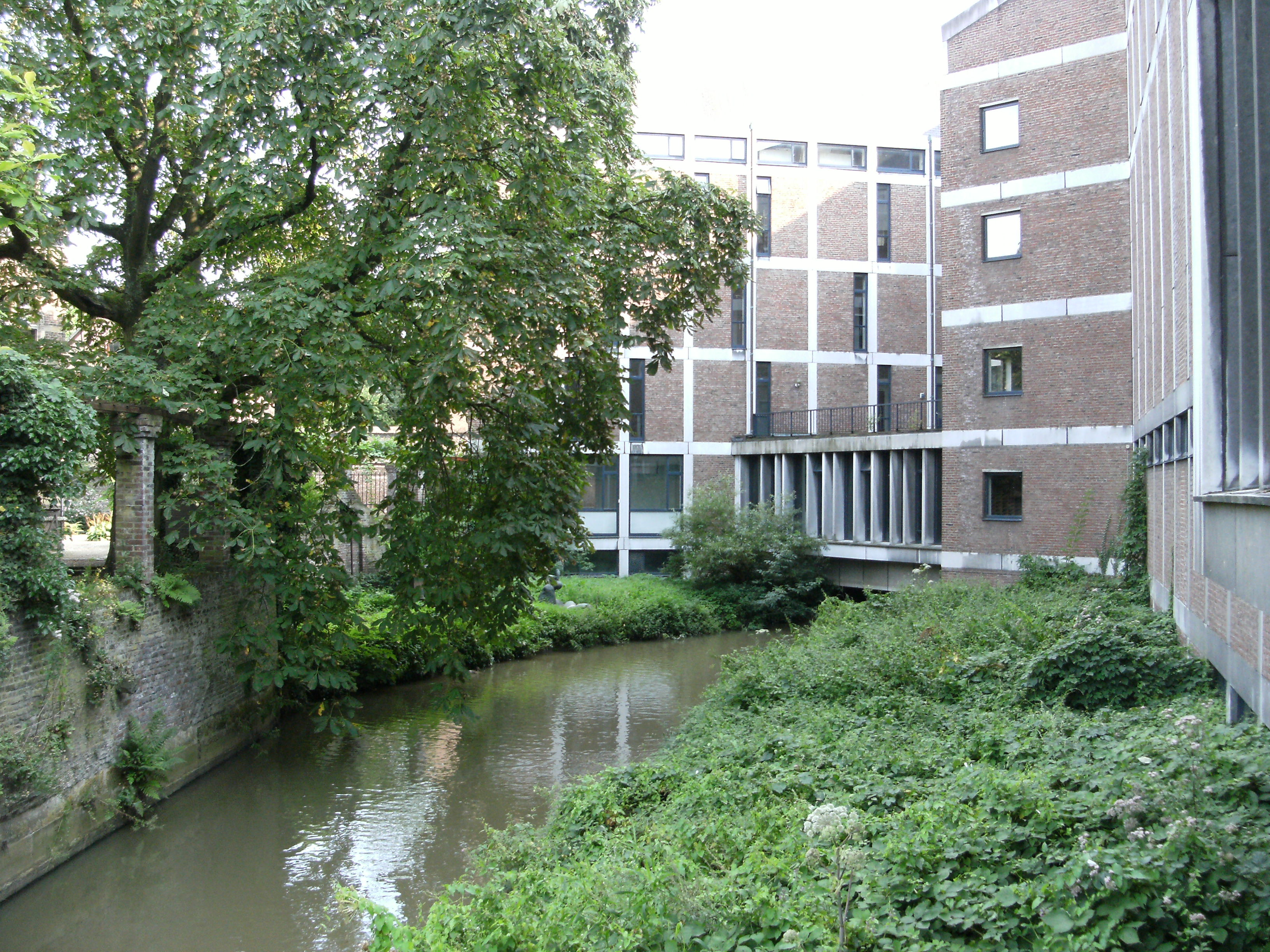
Jeker river passing buildings of Music Conservatorium at Maastricht

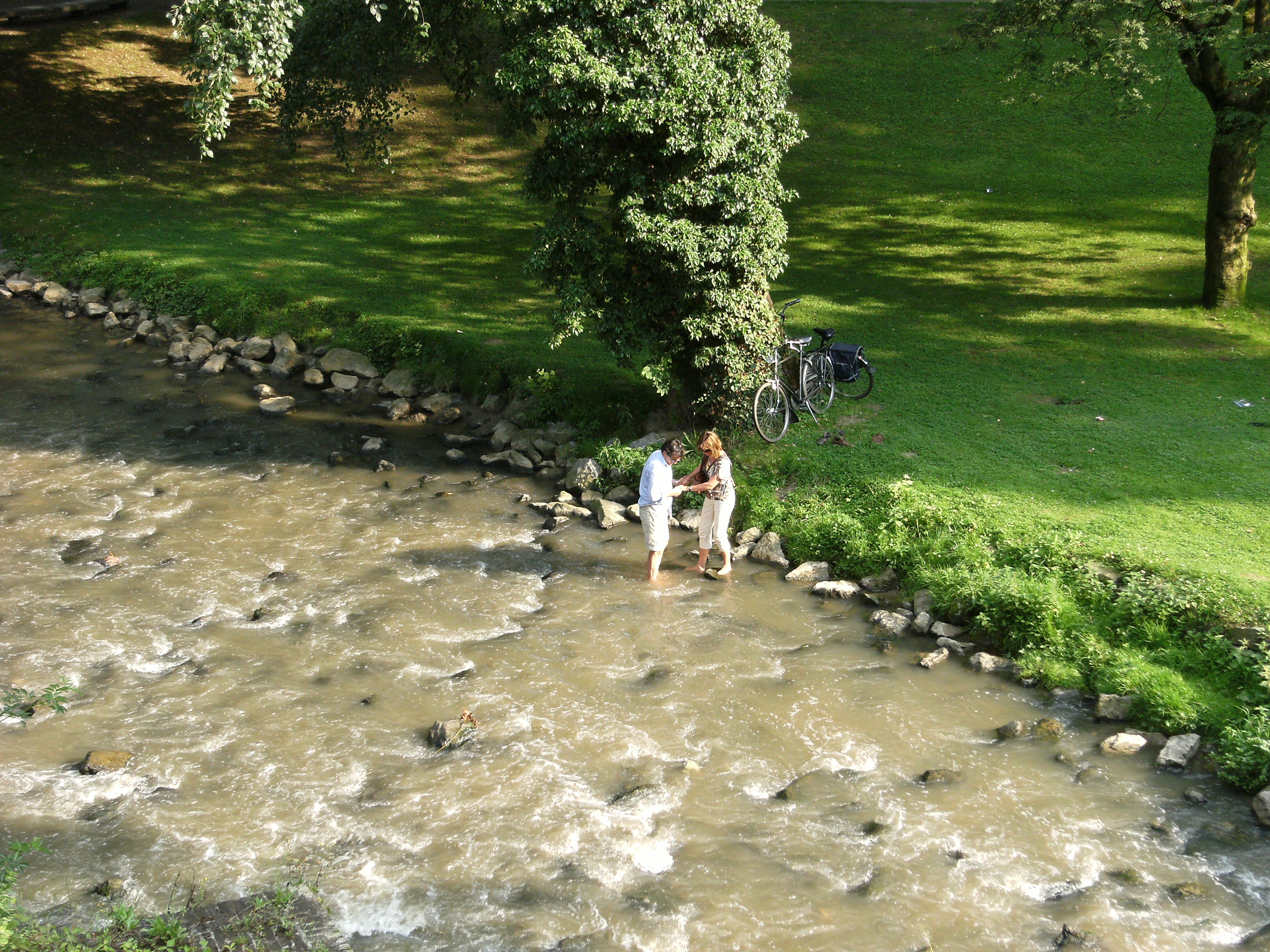
Jeker river passing through Maastricht citypark

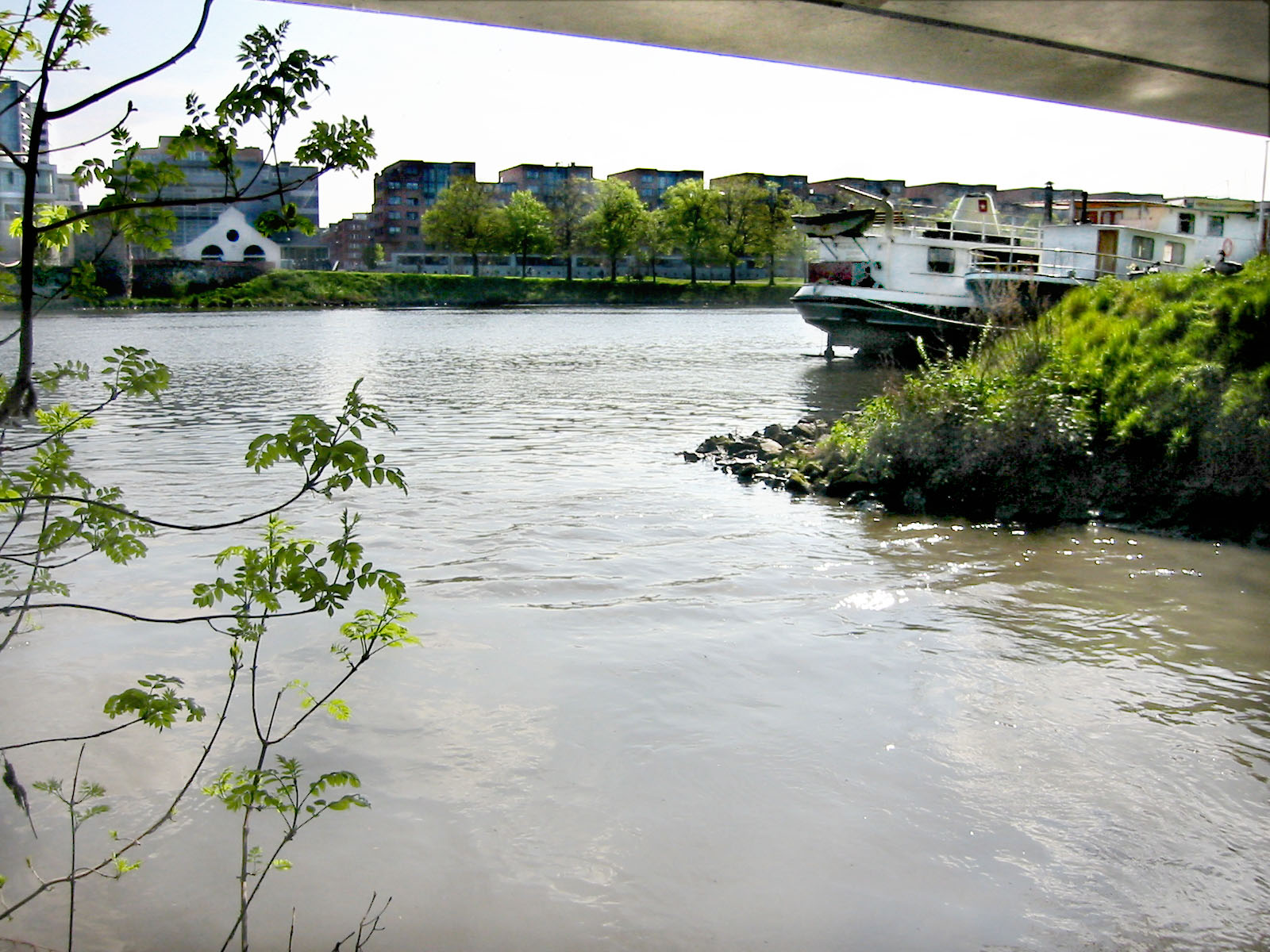
Jeker river's estuary in Meuse river
