= List of Antoinist temples =

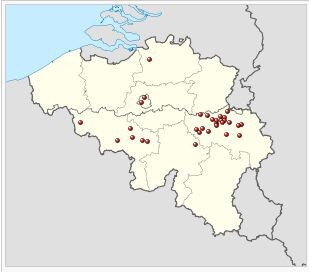

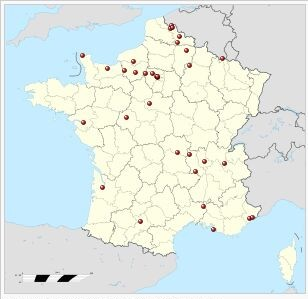

This is a list of temples built by Antoinism, a new religious movement founded in the early 20th century in Belgium, presented by country and in chronological order. A temple is a building in which the worship is performed by the antoinist clergy twice per day, at 10 a.m. and 7 p.m., except on Friday and Saturday, with few differences in France and in Belgium. All the buildings belong to the "Antoinist Worship" association, but one of them in Belgium is connected to the asbl "Les Disciples de Père et de Mère Antoine". There are currently 64 temples worldwide: 32 in Belgium, 31 in France and one in Monaco.

Historically, most of antoinist temples in Belgium were built before the World War II, when at least one of the founders was still alive. The first temple, the one of Jemeppe-sur-Meuse, was consecrated two years before the death of Louis Antoine, the founder of the religion. Other temples were often built in Belgian spa towns or in the countryside, and are mostly gathered in the French-speaking region — there are only three temples located in the Flanders region — and particularly in the province of Liège which counts 21 buildings. However, no temple has been built since 1968 and the antoinism spreading is now on the decline in the country, so much so that several places of worship are being unused because of a lack of clergy members. One of them — the temple in Tournai — was even sold in 2001.

By contrast, the constructions of the temples in France has been continued until 1993. The first place of worship was consecrated in 1913 in the 13th arrondissement of Paris. At present, there is an antoinist temple in the majority of main cities in France, although most of them are located in the north of Paris, especially in the Nord department where five temples are operating.

All the temples are built with anonymous donations or patronage.

== Temples in Belgium ==
Photos	Details
	Location: 2 rue Rousseau, Jemeppe-sur-Meuse; Coordinates: 50.619165°N 5.495524°E; Dedication: 15 August 1910, by Louis Antoine; Architectural style: Art Nouveau; Notes: Worldwide centre of the Antoinist worship
	Location: 145 rue Brondé, Verviers/Stembert; Coordinates: 50.601872°N 5.903735°E; Dedication: 10 September 1911, by Louis Antoine; Architectural style: Eclecticism; Notes: Currently unused for the worship
	Location: 414 chaussée de Hannut, Grâce-Hollogne/Bierset; Coordinates: 50.653134°N 5.447717°E; Dedication: October 1912, by Catherine; Architectural style: Eclecticism
	Location: 30 rue de l'Avenir, Courcelles/Souvret; Coordinates: 50.442065°N 4.348311°E; Dedication: 22 September 1913, by Catherine; Architectural style: Neo-Romanesque, Eclecticism
	Location: 5 rue Jehay, Villers-le-Bouillet; Coordinates: 50.56165°N 5.282364°E; Dedication: 29 March 1914, by Catherine; Architectural style: Eclecticism, Art Nouveau, Neo-Romanesque; Notes: Currently unused for the worship
	Location: 8 chaussée de Braine-le-Comte, Écaussinnes; Coordinates: 50.567157°N 4.152274°E; Dedication: 19 April 1914, by Catherine; Architectural style: Gothic Revival
	Location: 1 rue des Jardins, Verviers; Coordinates: 50.596287°N 5.858631°E; Dedication: 12 July 1914, by Catherine; Architectural style: Art Nouveau, Classicism
	Location: 2 rue de Tavier, Seraing; Coordinates: 50.595388°N 5.509043°E; Dedication: 10 October 1915, by Catherine; Architectural style: Art Nouveau, Neo-Romananesque
	Location: 14 rue Lenoir, Remicourt/Momalle; Coordinates: 50.689661°N 5.36695°E; Dedication: 25 December 1915, by Catherine; Architectural style: Eclecticism
	Location: 23 allée Verte, Visé; Coordinates: 50.735749°N 5.675683°E; Dedication: 23 April 1916, by Catherine; Architectural style: Neo-Romanesque, Eclecticism
	Location: 132 boulevard Guillaume Van Healen, Forest (Brussels); Coordinates: 50.823424°N 4.331317°E; Dedication: 6 August 1916, by Catherine; Architect: Charles Rifflart; Architectural style: Romanesque, Byzantine; Notes: Currently unused for the worship
	Location: 17 hors Château, Liège; Coordinates: 50.647746°N 5.578351°E; Dedication: 14 October 1917, by Catherine; Architectural style: Art Nouveau
	Location: 81 rue Émile Tilman, Herstal; Coordinates: 50.670762°N 5.634656°E; Dedication: November 1917, by Catherine; Architectural style: Art Nouveau, Eclecticism
	Location: 150 rue Charlemagne, Liège/Jupille; Coordinates: 50.644263°N 5.626888°E; Dedication: August 1918, by Catherine; Architectural style: Art Nouveau; Notes: Used as School of New Spiritualism
	Location: 140 rue Jules Destrée, Charleroi/Jumet-Gohissart; Coordinates: 50.43463°N 4.423027°E; Dedication: 20 April 1919, by Catherine; Architectural style: Neo-Romanesque; Notes: Currently unused for the worship
	Location: 69 rue Malvis, Saint-Nicolas/Montegnée; Coordinates: 50.642412°N 5.510974°E; Dedication: 12 October 1919, by Catherine; Architectural style: Art Nouveau, Art Déco
	Location: 501 chaussée de Brunehaut, Herstal/Vottem; Coordinates: 50.686861°N 5.574102°E; Dedication: 27 July 1923, by Catherine; Architectural style: Art Nouveau
	Location: 22 rue de France, Huy; Coordinates: 50.523277°N 5.245585°E; Dedication: 30 September 1923, by Catherine; Architectural style: Neo-Romanesque
	Location: 53 avenue Henri Monjoie, Waremme; Coordinates: 50.699366°N 5.259962°E; Dedication: 14 December 1924, by Catherine; Architectural style: Art Nouveau
	Location: 29 rue Jacques Rayé, Schaerbeek (Brussels); Coordinates: 50.870193°N 4.382687°E; Dedication: 2 August 1925, by the Second Representative of the Father; Architectural style: Neo-Romanticism
	Location: 111 route de Havelange, Ohey/Evelette; Coordinates: 50.407314°N 5.177608°E; Dedication: 31 October 1926, by Catherine; Architectural style: Neo-Romanticism; Notes: Currently unused for the worship
	Location: 32 Yernée-Fraineux, Nandrin; Coordinates: 50.530698°N 5.375576°E; Dedication: 25 June 1927, by Catherine; Architectural style:
	Location: 18 Frans De Ceusterlei, Schoten; Coordinates: 51.248459°N 4.461651°E; Dedication: 20 October 1929, by Catherine; Architectural style: Gothic Revival; Notes: Currently unused for the worship
	Location: 29 rue Jean Schinler, Sprimont; Coordinates: 50.499125°N 5.669889°E; Dedication: 15 December 1929, by Catherine; Architectural style: Gothic Revival
	Location: 2 rue du Père Antoine, Spa; Coordinates: 50.489405°N 5.870218°E; Dedication: 28 June 1931, by Catherine; Architectural style: Neo-Romanesque
	Location: 21 rue Georges Hubin, Wanze/Moha; Coordinates: 50.55358°N 5.186405°E; Dedication: 4 October 1931, by Catherine; Architectural style: Gothic Revival
	Location: 33 rue de l'Olive, La Louvière; Coordinates: 50.470945°N 4.188366°E; Dedication: 1933, by Catherine; Architectural style: Neo-Romanesque
	Location: 71 quai des Ardennes, Liège/Angleur; Coordinates: 50.618457°N 5.593972°E; Dedication: 9 June 1935, by Sister Deregnaucourt; Architectural style: Gothic Revival
	Location: 11 rue de la Borgnette, Tournai; Coordinates: 50.622024°N 3.3707°E; Dedication: October 1938, by Catherine; Architectural style: Art Déco; Notes: Sold in 2001
	Location: 143 avenue du Général de Gaulle, Mons; Coordinates: 50.441846°N 3.946195°E; Dedication: 30 September 1956; Architectural style: Neo-Romanesque
	Location: 3 rue de la Briqueterie, Fléron/Retinne; Coordinates: 50.625168°N 5.699201°E; Dedication: 10 November 1968, a delegate from the College of desservants in the Name of the Father; Architectural style: Gothic Revival; Notes: Does not belong to the Antoinist worship, but to the ASBL "Les Disciples de Père et de Mère Antoine"

== Temples in France ==
Photos	Details
	Location: 34 rue Vergniaud, 13th arrondissement of Paris; Coordinates: 48.827591°N 2.345388°E; Dedication: 26 October 1913, by Catherine; Architectural style: Neo-Romanesque, Eclecticism; Architect: Julien Flegenheimer
	Location: 48 boulevard du Jardin Exotique, Monaco; Coordinates: 43.73405°N 7.414269°E; Dedication: 14 December 1913, by Catherine; Architectural style: Neo-Romanesque; Notes: Only temple in Monaco
	Location: 7 rue Bargoing, Vichy, Allier; Coordinates: 46.120325°N 3.430953°E; Dedication: 5 September 1920, by Catherine; Architectural style: Romanesque art
	Location: 75 rue d'Amboise, Tours, Indre-et-Loire; Coordinates: 47.382399°N 0.687311°E; Dedication: 21 August 1921, by Catherine; Architectural style: Neo-Romanesque
	Location: 25 rue du Dr Ollier, Villeurbanne, Rhône; Coordinates: 45.767897°N 4.882929°E; Dedication: 22 or 27 August 1921, by Catherine; Architectural style: Art Nouveau, Eclecticism
	Location: 13 rue de Denain, Caudry, Nord; Coordinates: 50.123261°N 3.416555°E; Dedication: 1 October 1922, by Catherine; Architectural style: Neo-Romanesque
	Location: 6 rue du Tour de Ville, Vervins, Aisne; Coordinates: 49.836349°N 3.912635°E; Dedication: 5 September or 22–28 October 1923, by Catherine; Architectural style: Romanesque art; Architect: Alexandre Duchesne; Notes: Included in the General Inventory of Cultural Heritage
	Location: 3 chemin Saint Exupéry, Aix-les-Bains, Savoie; Coordinates: 45.685002°N 5.914528°E; Dedication: 24 August 1924, by Catherine; Architectural style: Romanesque art; Notes: Included in the General Inventory of Cultural Heritage
	Location: 91 rue de la Paix, Orange, Vaucluse; Coordinates: 44.135481°N 4.816677°E; Dedication: 19 September 1926, by Catherine; Architectural style: Romanesque art
	Location: 49, rue du Pré-Saint-Gervais, 19th arrondissement of Paris; Coordinates: 48.880691°N 2.397637°E; Dedication: 22 July 1928, by Catherine; Architectural style: Art Déco; Notes: Is also the headquarters of Antoinist worship for France and Monaco
	Location: 11 rue de la Constitution de Septembre 1791, Nantes, Loire Atlantique; Coordinates: 47.206064°N 1.588705°W; Dedication: 10 November 1929, by Catherine; Architectural style: Neo-Romanesque
	Location: 13 rue du Docteur Thomas, Reims, Maine-et-Loire; Coordinates: 49.265648°N 4.026607°E; Dedication: 28 September 1930, by Catherine; Architectural style: Neo-Romanesque, Gothic Revival
	Location: 2 avenue de l'Assomption, Nice, Alpes Maritimes; Coordinates: 43.721017°N 7.260514°E; Dedication: 15 October 1931, by Catherine; Architectural style: Neo-Romanesque, Gothic Revival
	Location: 4 rue de Madagascar, Valenciennes, Nord; Coordinates: 50.354278°N 3.4942°E; Dedication: 7 August 1932, by Catherine; Architectural style: Gothic Revival
	Location: 14 rue Caussidière, Saint-Étienne, Loire; Coordinates: 45.456819°N 4.376292°E; Dedication: 12 May 1935, by Catherine; Architectural style: Neo-Romanesque
	Location: 68 rue de Varsovie, Tourcoing, Nord; Coordinates: 50.734859°N 3.166112°E; Dedication: 12 December 1937, by Catherine; Architectural style: Art Déco
	Location: 43 rue Raspail, Croix, Nord; Coordinates: 50.689824°N 3.150533°E; Dedication: 20 July 1941, by a delegate of the College of Desservants in the Name of the Father; Architectural style: Art Déco
	Location: 23 boulevard Montebello, Lille, Nord; Coordinates: 50.625053°N 3.041582°E; Dedication: 10 November 1946, by a delegate of the College of Desservants in the Name of the Father; Architectural style: Art Déco
	Location: 3 rue de Dreux, Évreux, Eure; Coordinates: 49.017031°N 1.159272°E; Dedication: 12 December 1948, by a delegate of the College of Desservants in the Name of the Father; Architectural style: Gothic Revival; Cost: 5,500,000 francs
	Location: 145 boulevard Jean Jaurès, Rouen, Seine Maritime; Coordinates: 49.454596°N 1.058636°E; Dedication: 8 October 1950, by a delegate of the College of Desservants in the Name of the Father; Architectural style: Gothic Revival; Cost: 3,900,000 francs
	Location: 4 rue Anne de Ticheville, Bernay, Eure; Coordinates: 49.091883°N 0.591674°E; Dedication: 16 September 1951, by a delegate of the College of Desservants in the Name of the Father; Architectural style: Neo-Romanesque; Cost: 4,000,000 francs
	Location: 79 rue Saint-Sauveur, Cherbourg-Octeville, Manche; Coordinates: 49.632312°N 1.629152°W; Dedication: 13 July 1952, by a delegate of the College of Desservants in the Name of the Father; Architectural style: Romanesque art
	Location: 10 passage Roux, 17th arrondissement of Paris; Coordinates: 48.883034°N 2.29743°E; Dedication: 27 March 1955, by a delegate of the College of Desservants in the Name of the Father; Architectural style: Art Déco
	Location: 7 rue des Juifs, Orléans, Loiret; Coordinates: 47.903484°N 1.916814°E; Dedication: 26 May 1957, by a delegate of the College of Desservants in the Name of the Father; Architectural style: Neo-Romanesque, Gothic Revival
	Location: 32 traverse de Tiboulen, Marseille, Bouches-du-Rhône; Coordinates: 43.244968°N 5.37461°E; Dedication: 18 October 1959, by a delegate of the College of Desservants in the Name of the Father; Architectural style: Neo-Romanesque
	Location: 3 rue de la Convention, Roanne, Loire; Coordinates: 46.023966°N 4.06757°E; Dedication: 1 October 1961, by a delegate of the College of Desservants in the Name of the Father; Architectural style: Art Déco
	Location: 42 rue de Goya, Bordeaux, Gironde; Coordinates: 44.845418°N 0.587168°W; Dedication: 25 October 1964, by a delegate of the College of Desservants in the Name of the Father; Architectural style: Art Déco
	Location: 48 rue des Coquilles, Mantes-la-Jolie, Yvelines; Coordinates: 48.998015°N 1.706228°E; Dedication: 5 June 1966, by a delegate of the College of Desservants in the Name of the Father; Architectural style: Art Déco
	Location: 50 avenue de Bellevue, Conflans-Sainte-Honorine, Yvelines; Coordinates: 48.993087°N 2.108302°E; Dedication: 7 October 1984, by a delegate of the College of Desservants in the Name of the Father; Architectural style: Neo-Romanesque
	Location: 50 rue Philippe-Auguste Rase, Saulnes, Meurthe-et-Moselle; Coordinates: 49.529944°N 5.816746°E; Dedication: 13 July 1986, by a delegate of the College of Desservants of France; Architectural style: Neo-Romanesque
	Location: 6 chemin des bœufs, Cormelles-le-Royal, Calvados; Coordinates: Dedication: 1991, by a delegate of the College of Desservants in the Name of the Father; Architectural style: Romanesque art
	Location: 12 rue de Cherbourg, Toulouse, Haute-Garonne; Coordinates: 43.593027°N 1.429628°E; Dedication: 1993, by a delegate of the College of Desservants in the Name of the Father; Architectural style: Eclecticism

== Bibliography ==
- Dericquebourg, Régis (1993). Les Antoinistes (in French). Turnhout: Brepols. ISBN 2-503-50325-X.
