= Antoinism =

New religious movement founded in 1910 in Belgium

- The tree of the science of the sight of the evil, symbol of Antoinism
- Orientation: Healing, Christianity
- Leader: Louis Antoine
- Region: Belgium, France, Monaco
- Members: between 10,000 and 200,000

Antoinism is a healing-oriented new religious movement founded in 1910 by Louis-Joseph Antoine (1846–1912) in Jemeppe-sur-Meuse, Seraing in Belgium. With a total of 64 temples, over forty reading rooms across the world and thousands of members, it remains the only religion established in Belgium whose notoriety and success has reached outside the country. Mainly active in France, the religious movement is characterized by a decentralized structure, simple rites, discretion and tolerance towards other faiths.

Raised a Catholic, Antoine worked as a coal miner in his youth, then as a steelworker, before performing his military service in 1866. After marrying Catherine in 1873, he moved several times for professional reasons. Deeply impressed by Allan Kardec's writings, he organized a spiritualist group in the 1890s. In 1893, the death of his son marked the definitive loss of his faith in Catholicism. In 1896, he explained his Spiritist views in a book, then discovered the gifts of healing. Quickly known as a healer, he gathered many followers, mainly among workers disappointed by Catholicism or medicine. In 1906, he broke with Spiritism and started a religion, then published three books outlining his doctrine and consecrated the first Antoinist temple. After his death in 1912, Catherine ensured the continuity of the religion, promoting a centralized worship around the person of her husband and introducing certain Catholic-inspired elements along with additional rules in the organization. When she died in 1940, some differences happened between the French and the Belgian temples.

Antoinist beliefs combine some elements of Catholicism, reincarnation, and esoteric healing. In the Antoinist views, the man must reach consciousness by getting rid of the illusion of matter produced by his intelligence—the source of evil and suffering. The purpose of life is to release oneself from the cycle of reincarnation through a moral progression aided by "fluids"—all human actions, acquired by silent prayer and the harm caused by diseases and enemies. As freedom of conscience and free will are considered very important in the Antoinist creed, the religion does not practice proselytism and is not exclusive. It does not provide any prescription on social issues. Although focused on healing, Antoinism does not interfere with the medical field, and does not discourage the resort to traditional medicine.

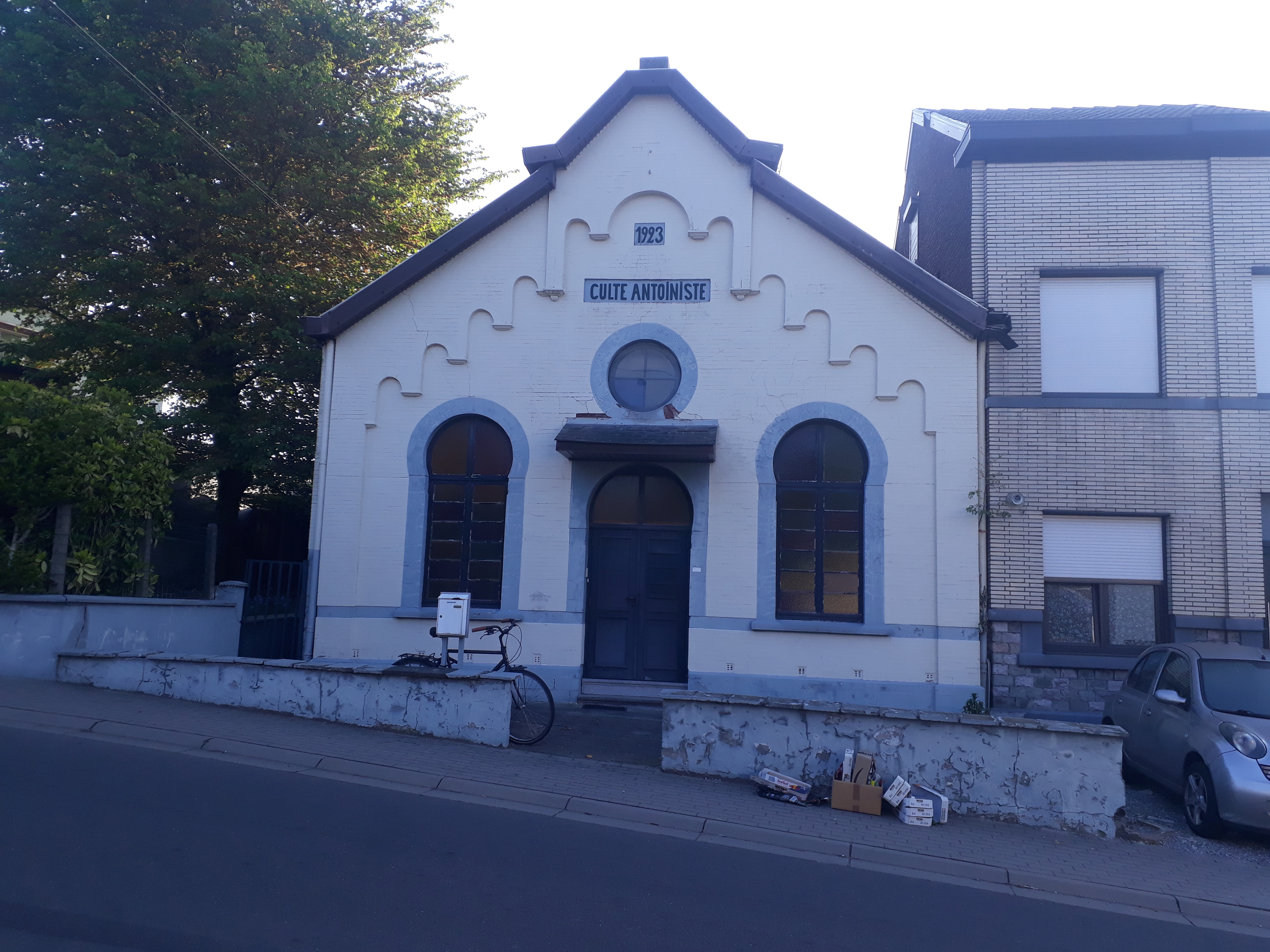
Antoinist temple in Vottem, Belgium

Simple and brief, services are performed in the temples, generally twice per day, and are composed of two forms of worship: "The General Operation", which consists of the transmission of the fluid to the churchgoers, and "The Reading" of Antoine's writings. Members who performed the services wear an entirely black dress, as sign of an intense involvement in the religion; they are not paid. Temples are also the place of consultations of a healer by people who wish to obtain a request, frequently related to health. Antoinist celebrations include Christian holidays and other three days that commemorate the founding couple and the dedication of the first temple. Registered as organism of public utility in Belgium and as religious association in France, the religion is directed by a college composed of the most active members called desservants. It is financed by anonymous donations and does not ask for money from its followers. In France, the cult classification of Antoinism in the 1995 Parliamentary Report was criticized by the sociologists who studied the religious group, and many people involved in the anti-cults fight did not report cultic deviances.

== History ==
=== 1846–1912: Founder Louis Antoine ===
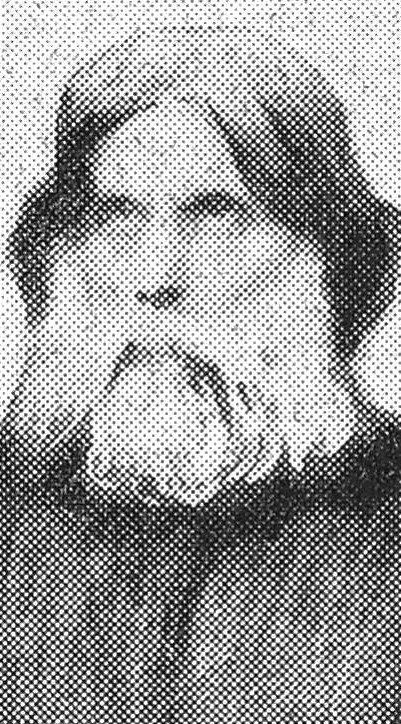
Photograph of Antoine published in the French newspaper Excelsior, 1912

==== Childhood and professional activities ====
Louis-Joseph Antoine was born on 7 June 1846 in Mons-Crotteux, Belgium at a place called "In the Chapel", the youngest of a large family, which belonged to the Roman Catholic Church. His mother was Catherine Castille, born in 1797. He was raised in the Priesse street and attended primary school in Mons. From the age of twelve, Louis was employed as a coal miner, following in the footsteps of his father. One day, while working at the mine, his lamp went out without apparent reason, which he interpreted as a divine sign that he should abandon this work. He worked for two years in the mine, then was a steelworker in the Cockerill factory in Seraing. He was enrolled in the militia of Belgium in 1866, and filled his military obligations in Bruges. During the Franco-Prussian War, he accidentally killed a comrade; although there was no legal action, this event led him to question the meaning of life. After marrying Jeanne Catherine Collon on 15 April 1873, while he was a hammerer, he became the father of a son, Louis Martin Joseph, born in Hamborn, Prussia on 23 September 1873, and baptized five days later in the Catholic Church of St. John. Then the family went to Belgium in August 1876, where Antoine bought a horse and became a vegetable vendor. In 1878, he began to suffer from recurring stomach aches. In February 1879, he returned to Poland where he was hired as hammerer chief by Mr. Pastor in the Pragua steelworks; there his wife ran a school canteen. Five years later, the family moved to Jemeppe-sur-Meuse (Belgium), where he built twenty houses for workers. On 5 February 1886, Antoine was sentenced to a fine of two francs on the grounds of physical violence on Denis Collon on 10 October 1885. Until 1900, he was a portier and a collector of Lexhy factory.

==== Influence by Spiritism ====
Though young, Antoine showed great piety, which the historian Pierre Debouxhtay described as a "devotion of a rather scrupulous formalism". Despite his strong faith, Antoine was unsatisfied with his religion. He began to be influenced by the writings of Allan Kardec and, through his friend Gustave Gon, was initiated in 1884 in Spiritism in attending Spiritist meetings to Tilleur, alongside his wife and his nephew Pierre Dor. In Jemeppe-sur-Meuse, with friends, he started a Spiritist movement called "The Vine Growers of the Lord" ("Les Vignerons du Seigneur"). Often ill, his son attended evening school in Jemeppe, then worked at the Society of Belgian Northern Railways (Société des Chemins de Fer du Nord Belge); At his death on 23 April 1893 because of a phlebitis, Antoine and his group definitively broke with Christianity; moreover, after participating in Spiritist meetings, parents believed that their deceased son was reincarnated as a pharmacist in Paris. Antoine published in 1896 a book entitled Little Spiritist Catechism (Petit catéchisme spirite) to explain his own doctrinal views; shaped on the Catechism of the Catholic Church, this writing was successful and was translated into Spanish. Antoine organized public meetings of Spiritism the first Sunday of each month at his home, and the second and the fourth Sundays at Pierre Debroux's home, people being invited to meetings through flyers. He then discovered the gifts of healing and by 1900, he received many sufferers to heal; thenceforth, he was known as the "healer of Jemeppe". He distributed remedies learned from Spiritism and advocated vegetarianism, as well as temperance and avoidance of fatty foods.

On 8 November 1900, the prosecutor of Liège, who had received an anonymous letter, asked doctors Louis Lenger and Gabriel Corin to investigate the healing activities of Antoine. On 14 December, the Commissioner raided the pharmacist Nizet, installed in Jemeppe, who received orders made by Antoine to heal the sick. Three days later, the prosecutor and the two doctors asked Antoine about his healing activities and attended several consultations. In his report, the prosecutor stated that Anthony was very cooperative, that his treatments were "simple" and that it was certain that he obtained many recoveries but only under suggestion; he noticed his "absolute sincerity", but also asserted his activities could be "a danger to public health". Antoine appeared before the Criminal Court on 19 February 1901; Dr. Corin and three patients who reported having been cured succeeded at the witness box. Finally, Antoine was sentenced to a suspended fine of 60 francs, which did not prevent him to enjoy great renown. Meanwhile, on 25 December 1900, approximately 180 people attended the inauguration of a new building located at the corner of Tomballes and Bois-du-Mont streets that Antoine had purchased earlier the same year, and then decorated with portraits of Allan Kardec, the cure of Ars and Dr. House.

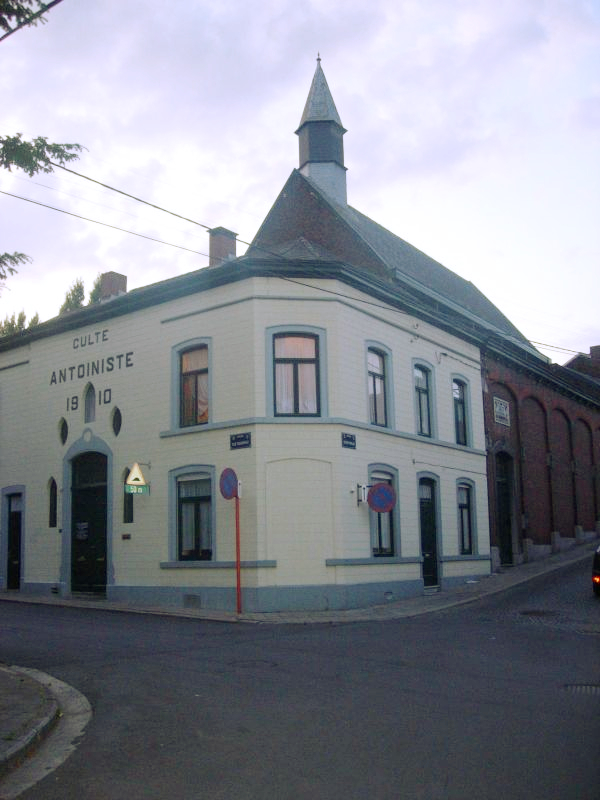
The temple in Jemeppe-sur-Meuse, the first one of the religion, was consecrated by Antoine in 1910.

In 1901, Antoine posted an advertisement in the Spiritist journal The Messenger (Le Messager) seeking doctors who would associate with him, but the attempt did not meet with success. At the same time, he was deeply influenced by Léon Denis' book In the Invisible. He began to give up his remedies, particularly because of his then recent trial, and gradually left Spiritism, as he was sometimes deceived by false mediums. In 1902, his group The Vine Growers of the Lord, although solicited, did not participate in the creation of a Spiritist Federation, then in 1905, the members did not attend the preparatory meeting of the Congress in Liège and refused the 0.25 franc contribution. In 1905, he saw up to 400 patients per day. Around the same time, he published a four-page leaflet which commented on passages of the Gospels without reference to Spiritism.

==== Foundation of a new religion ====
In 1906, Antoine discovered a spirituality he called a "new spiritualism", which led him to definitely give up Spiritism, to decide to heal by faith alone and to perform only collective healing in a temple, and thus started to lay the foundations of a structured religious movement. That year, the followers of The Vine Growers of the Lord attended for the last time the national convention of Spiritists in Charleroi, which officially marked the end of their mutual support, and the following year, Antoine publicly abjured any practice of Spiritism. In addition, the moral dimension became more present in the doctrine, while the experimental disappeared. Given this abandonment of the Spiritist doctrine, the new religious group was criticized in Spiritist journals.

At that time, Antoine had a student named Martin Jeanfils, an employee at the Corbeau coal. A few years ago, Jeanfils was certain to get a gift of healing by treating knee and foot sprains of his wife and himself, and was then consulted by patients in Jemeppe. Antoine and he were sued on 16 January 1907 on the grounds of illegal practice of the art of healing. Jeanfils explained to the court that he just wanted to heal the pain, and that he always sent his patients to doctors. For his part, Antoine told the judge that he simply put his hand on the forehead of patients and that he prescribed drugs; he denied the charge, and all the witnesses heard testified of the altruism of Antoine, who distributed money to the poor. Antoine and Jeanfils appeared before the Criminal Court on 15 June 1907, and the courtroom was entirely filled. Dr. Delville and the parents of a child cured by Antoine testified from the witness box; Mr. Dupret then pronounced the indictment. The judgment was adjourned and finally, on 21 June 1907, President Hamoir acquitted the two men, who were absent from court. Following an appeal by the prosecutor, Antoine and Jeanfils appeared before the Court again on 16 October 1907. The General Advocate Meyers made the indictment, analyzing the legislation of 1918 on the illegal art of healing, claiming that it was not what Antoine did. On 22 October of the same year, the acquittal was confirmed, and Meyers was deeply thanked by several faithful.

Mrs. Desart, a stenographer, transcribed the teachings of Antoine in a magazine, The Halo of Consciousness (L'Auréole de la conscience), published from May 1907 to April 1909, while three books were successively published, works in which the new doctrine was developed and which contained the Antoinist creed, "The Ten Principles of the Father". At that time, the temple was quickly filled every day and Antoine received daily about 250 letters or telegrams. Unlike today, some proselytism was performed by 70 hawkers wearing coats and hats and with briefcases. From May 1909 to Easter 1910, Antoine did not appear in public, and lived alone to practice fasting and prayer, and the worship was assumed by one of his followers, Florian Deregnaucourt, who also published the Antoinist literature. On 15 August 1910, Antoine announced that he would no longer do individual consultations, and consecrated the temple of Jemeppe-sur-Meuse, located on rue Bois-de-Mont (later rue Alfred Smeets, at the present rue Rousseau), which cost about 100,000 francs. Antoine presented his wife as his successor and appointed a council composed of followers to manage financial issues of the religion. At the meeting of 11 June 1911, the council proposed the publishing of a newspaper titled The Unitive (L'Unitif) which was released in September of the same year, with a printing of 400,000 copies for the first issue, and 6,000 subscribers. In the context of legal proceedings for the worship registration, secretary of the Antoinist committee Deregnaucourt wrote to the Minister of the Interior on 29 March 1910 and to the Minister of Justice and Religious Affairs on 19 April 1910. A petition of 160,000 signatures to demand official recognition of the Antoinist religion was sent to the House of Representatives on 2 December 1910, and forwarded to the Minister of Justice on 27 January 1911.

Although his predictions were sometimes inaccurate, Antoine was then regarded as a prophet by his followers, and some of them said it could perform supernatural apparitions; for his part, Antoine said nothing about the possible truthfulness of these phenomena. Named "The Father" by his followers, Antoine died — "disembodied" in Antoinist doctrine — on 25 June 1912 as the result of an attack of stroke. Then there were rumors that he would resurrect on the third day, but Debouxhtay believed that they emanated from "jesters" and that Antoinists did not believe this. The procession which took place at his funeral on 30 June 1912 was a great event in Jemeppe, and on this occasion, 100,000 faithful came to pray over his body. Subsequently, Antoinists were allowed to move the body, initially in the pauper's grave, to the town cemetery. In 1920, Antoine's widow asked the country's Queen to allow her to carry the body in the temple garden of Jemeppe where a chapel would be erected, but this request failed.

As a legacy, a street in Spa was named "Father Antoine Street" ("Rue du Père Antoine") after a decision by the Liberal Party of the city in 1931, and a 1952 painted plaster bust of Antoine is exhibited at the Museum of Walloon Life (Musée de la Vie wallonne) in Liège.

==== Splinter groups ====
When Antoine was alive, a minor splinter group was led in Verviers by a man named Jousselin. A more important schism from Antoinism was initiated by Pierre Dor (born 15 May 1862, Mons-Crotteux), Louis Antoine's nephew, and was named "Dorism". He first participated in the Spiritist circle of his uncle, "The Vine Growers of the Lord", but decided to split off, as he believed he had himself gifts of healing. He tried to heal sufferers, but did not achieve success and returned to the group of his uncle. However, he accompanied one of his patients in Russia, where he enjoyed success since he healed about 7,000 people per week, but came back to Belgium after complaints from doctors. In Roux-Wilbeauroux, he built a hall called "The Moral School" ("L'École Morale") where he healed the sick and dispensed roughly the same teachings as that of his uncle. He explained his theory in two books respectively published in 1912 and 1913, entitled Catechism of the Restoration of the Soul (Catéchisme de la restauration de l'âme) and Christ Speaks Again (Le Christ parle à nouveau)—as he identified himself to Jesus Christ, and Antoine to John the Baptist—which Debouxhtay considered as a potential plagiarism of Antoine's writings. Dor encouraged a diet of vegetables boiled in water and chastity before marriage. In 1916, he was convicted of illegally practicing the healing art. Thereafter, he moved to Uccle, and his movement disappeared following his death on 5 March 1947. As Antoinism, Dorism was criticized by some Catholic clergy members.

=== 1912–1940: Wife Catherine as successor ===
The illiterate wife of Louis Antoine, Catherine (born 26 May 1850, Jemeppe sur Meuse – died 3 November 1940, Jemeppe sur Meuse), called "The Mother" by the followers, was designated by him as his successor, but received no advice from him on how to manage the religion. In December 1918, then in September 1919, she sent letters respectively to the King of Belgium and the Minister of Justice to obtain legal recognition of the Antoinist worship; in the month of March of the following two years, Secretary of worship Ferdinand Delcroix sent two letters in the same purpose, which resulted in 1922 in the recognition of public utility of the religion.

To seek to prevent any misappropriation of the charism of Antoine within the movement after his death, the Antoinist journal L'Unitif published articles which presented Catherine as the legitimate successor and also redefined precisely the limits of the healers' role. To avoid a succession crisis and to ensure the continuity of the religion, Catherine decided to promote a centralized worship around the person of her husband and thus established various rules between 1925 and 1930. For example, she placed, in the temple before the high platform, the photograph of her husband with the mention "The Father is making the Operation", then added her own portrait. She also authorized the desservants—the members the most involved in the religion—to perform the General Operation from the higher platform, but wanted that the ceremony would be preceded by a statement that it is the Father who performs the Operation and that the faith must be placed in him to obtain satisfaction. She insisted that the desservant installed in the platform would be sat during the reading of Antoine's writings. She also organized the Father's day, on 25 June, and rituals such as baptism, communion and marriage, which transformed the group into an institutionalized religion. She ordered that nothing should be changed in her husband's writings and in 1932 closed reading rooms in which followers gave personal teachings. However, unlike the writings of her husband which can be sold by anyone, changes and rules established by Catherine are recorded in books only available to the desservants, thus remaining confidential. From 17 June 1930, a faithful named Narcisse Nihoul replaced her to perform the General Operation at the platform of the temple.

=== 1940–2026: Continuity of the worship ===
The history of Antoinism was very quiet after 1940. In Belgium, Joseph Nihoul, the President of the Antoinist Council, then his successors, led the religion until their death, alongside the members of this body. The authority of Catherine was challenged just after her death by the Belgian branch of the movement, which has withdrawn the religious changes she made: removal of photographs in the temples, deletion of baptism, marriage and communion, opposition to the translation of Antoine's works. However, a Belgian group who, claiming to be faithful to the true Antoinist tradition, opened a temple in Angleur on 1 April 1943, preferred to keep the portraits of the Antoines in the temple. In France, the Antoinists wanted to be faithful to all requirements provided by the founding couple. In spite of these differences, the two branches show each other support and tolerance. Thus, after the death of Catherine, there were two forms of Antoinism, which still remain different today: one in Belgium, and one in France.

In Belgium, the growth of the religion quickly begin to slow down, even to decline, as indicated by the fact that no temple has been built since 1968 and that several of them are currently unused because of a lack of dressed members and/or money. In contrast, the constructions of the temples in France has been continued until 1993, when a new temple in Toulouse was opened.

== Beliefs ==
"The only remedy which can heal humanity is THE FAITH; Faith is born of Love; that kind of Love which convinces us that God dwells in our very enemies; hence not loving our enemies is not loving God; it is the Love we have for our enemies that renders us worthy of serving him; it is the sole Love which makes us really loving, because it is pure and true"

— Translation of "The Halo of Consciousness", written on the back wall in the temple.

=== Theology ===
Antoinism believes in a dualistic universe composed of a spiritual world governed by the law of God or consciousness, and of a corporal world, governed by natural laws, in which matter is an illusion perceived by the imagination generated by intelligence. The man combines in himself both worlds, as he has a physical body and a divine consciousness. In Antoinist views, the importance of human laws and science is weakened as they are based not on consciousness, but on intelligence. The view of the matter is, however, not considered a sin, but an error that causes suffering.

The religious movement believes in a moral progression through reincarnation after death: the transmigration of the spirit in a human body only reflects the degree of spiritual elevation. The reincarnated person has no recollection of the past lives, and can again make progress in his spiritual course that allows him, at the end, to reach the divine state which releases him from the cycle of reincarnation. The harm caused by disease and by people is seen as a beneficial cure, as the pain can increase one's spiritual progress and thus contribute to one's salvation. The silent prayer is also considered as a way to connect the spirit to consciousness. Antoine, who suffered from disease and demonstrated asceticism and dedication throughout his life, is regarded by followers as a role model to attain salvation.

Antoinist doctrine provides another interpretation to the original sin in the book of Genesis: Adam began to follow Eve, who had placed her confidence in a serpent, symbol of matter. By imagining the materiality of the physical world, he abandoned the divine consciousness in which he lived and produced the ideas of good and evil. The "tree of knowledge of good and evil" in the Bible is redefined as "the tree of the science of the sight of evil". Antoinism claimed to not be an atheist religion, but has a particular conception of God: this one does not exist outside of humans, and they do not exist outside of God. Therefore, as God would live in every human, it is highly recommended to love one's enemies. In addition, the doctrine of the Trinity is not accepted.

Flexible and little binding, Antoinist beliefs are close to the contemporary belief, as followers can choose the beliefs they wish and interpret events as they want. The religion attaches great importance to freedom of conscience and free will, which renders it attractive and promotes a diversity of beliefs among the followers who can refer simultaneously to other religious traditions. Some believers see Antoine as an incarnation of God; others, who continue to practice Catholicism, consider him a prophet equal to Jesus Christ; others, who adhere to New Age doctrines, perceive him as a spiritual figure. The movement rejects indoctrination of children and proselytism, even towards people who visit the temple, tolerates other religions as they teach the faith and prayer and thus detach people from the material world, and considers tolerance the highest virtue to practise. The religion does not provide any prescription on issues such as divorce, abortion and sexuality, has no political purpose and do not use honorary titles, considering all people equal. A periodical directed by writer Louis Pauwels summarized the main purposes of the religion as being the "mutual aid, spiritual and human solidarity, availability and hospitality".

=== Fluids ===
Fundamental principle of the cosmos, the fluid is a recurrent theme in Antoinism. Thoughts, words, human actions and social ties are considered as fluids. As their quality depends on the moral progress of a person, there are "spiritual" and "heavy" fluids. They can be transmitted, perceived by the intelligence and purified through meditation. A good fluid is supposed to be acquired by love and prayer, and has various uses: it can act as a divine power that regenerates the whole person, destroy evil and heal. It is believed that Antoine can transmit the good fluid and that the temple platform is the place of the most number of fluids.

As good fluids are supposed to be transferable, the Antoinist dress used during the worship is often placed on the bed of a suffering person to help his recovery; similarly, some faithful put a request on a paper in a box under the platform so that the wish happens, others buy a photo of Antoine at a ceremony to be protected. To prevent negative fluids from entering the temple, several rules were established: for example, those who perform the worship are not allowed to wear jewelry or makeup in the building.

=== Healing ===
Although focused on healing, Antoinism does not propose any diagnosis nor prescription, and does not practice the laying on of hands; the faithful may also resort to traditional medicine. In the books of the temple, it is stated that desservants are not allowed to discourage them to consult a doctor and they should pray that they find an "inspired" doctor. Generally, consulting an Antoinist healer is merely a supplement to conventional medicine. Because of its healer doctrine, the religious group is almost always compared to Christian Science; however, in spite of several similarities with this religion as well as with Friedrich Hegel's works, Belgian historian Pierre Debouxhtay rejected the idea that they could have been potential influences on Antoine's doctrines. According to him, it is possible that Antoine was influenced by Doukhobors.

When Antoine was alive, many observers thought that the healings he obtained resulted to suggestion only, and Dr. Schuind, who wrote two articles in The Meuse (La Meuse) on the subject at the time, criticized the lack of control and vague diagnostics surrounding these healings. Sociologist Anne-Cécile Bégot considered the Antoinist healing of the first decades a form of protest against (1) the efficiency of medicine, (2) the traditional representation of disease—the real healing can be attained only through a new approach to the disease, which is never considered a particular misfortune and thus is not reduced to its biological dimension—and (3) the management of disease—the sick are always responsible for their own illness. However, she concluded that this protest has evolved throughout time as (1) the disease is now represented on an endogenous etiological model, which indicates a process of individualization of the religion, and (2) the personal real-life experience is more presented as the cause of the disease than the relation to the global society.

== Practices ==
=== Worship ===
Day	Country	
Day	Belgium	France
Sunday	10 a.m.: Reading	10 a.m.: General Operation + Reading; 7 p.m.: Reading
from Monday to Thursday	10 a.m.: General Operation; 7 p.m.: Reading	10 a.m.: General Operation + Reading^{1}; 7 p.m.: Reading
Friday	—	7 p.m.: Reading
^{1} "The Charity Moral" or "The Ten Principles of The Father"

The Antoinism worship takes place in temples. A dressed member welcomes anyone who enters the temple by calling them "brother" and "sister", even if they are just visitors. The service is very unceremonial and informal, as there is no liturgy, singing, or pre-set prayers, and lasts from 15 to 30 minutes. Attendance at worship is not required and many people come sporadically. According to sociologist Régis Dericquebourg, "the Antoinist worship is a ritual of intercession. (...) It is a time of big emotional intensity with an intimate aspect".

The service is composed of two practices:

- "The General Operation" ("L'Opération Générale") : Established by Antoine in 1910, it begins and ends with three strokes of bell. It is briefly announced by a dressed member. After meditating in a room on the back of the temple, a desservant climb to the highest platform, and the dressed follower goes to the other platform. Both are standing and pray for a few minutes to transmit the fluid to the churchgoers. Then, if the reading of the sacred texts is scheduled just after, as it is the case in France, the desservant whispers to the dressed follower to perform the reading. Originally Antoine practiced this form of worship only on holidays (except Sundays) and on the 1st and 15th days of each month, before extending it to the first four days of the week. It was in 1932 that the General Operation was performed in all Antoinist temples, and no longer only in the one of Jemeppe; furthermore, on 3 December 1933, Catherine decided that the ritual would be also perform every Sunday.
- "The Reading" ("La Lecture"): It lasts twenty minutes and consists of the reading of Antoine's book L'Enseignement by the dressed follower. The reading ends when he thanks the audience.

There are few differences in schedules between the services in Belgium and that of France (see the table).

=== Consultations by a healer ===
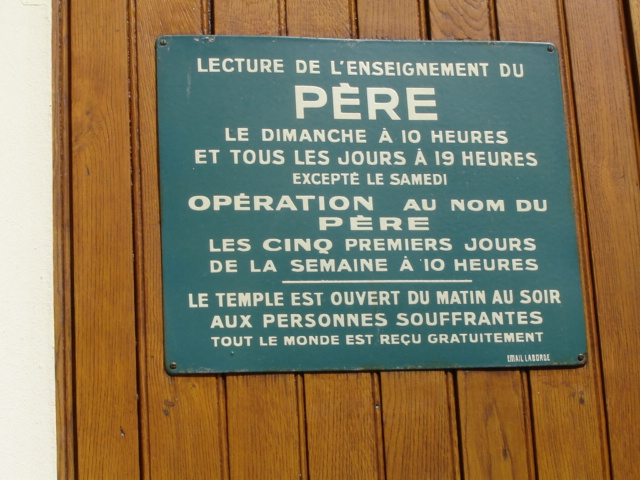
A plaque on the door of the temple indicates that suffering people can be received freely from morning to evening.

After the service, some people—regular faithful or visitors—may ask to consult a healer in one of the small rooms of the temple—although the desservant who lives in the apartment adjacent to the temple is always available to receive suffering persons. During these consultations, both are standing before Antoine's image: the patient expresses for a few minutes the request that he wishes to obtain, and the healer prays, sometimes while touching the consultant's shoulder or hand, presumably to convey the fluid. The healer's work is said to put again the consultant in the love of God that will allow him to find himself the spiritual journey leading to healing. For this purpose, the healer has to discover the origin of the consultant's problem, which is, in Antoinist beliefs, always linked to a person's own history, and to understand that he should bear the consequences of what was done in a preceding life.

A 2001 survey reported by Dr. Axel Hoffman showed that an Antoinist healer had received 216 patients over a period of twenty days, that the reasons to consult were related to physical (47%), psychological (19%), sentimental (13%) and professional (13%) issues, and that most of these people also consulted a doctor. The Antoinist healing process does not include a doctrinal teaching nor a psychological manipulation. It does not necessarily imply the end of the problem or illness, and can be divided into three phases: the relief provided by the healer through listening and intercession with God, then acceptance of the problem which requires the recognition of one's responsibilities, and finally the inner peace that results. Whether immediate or gradual, healings are never considered as miracles in the religion because they are supposed to occur inevitably when all necessary conditions, including the faith of the patient, are met. Even after several consultations, the consultant does not necessarily become a follower. Several sociologists deemed the Antoinist healing as "exorcist" as well as "adorcist".

=== Marriage, communion, baptism and funeral ===
Catherine established rituals such as baptism of infants, blessing of couples and communion of young people. They simply consist of an "elevation of thought" that take place after the services in a consulting room of the temple. These rituals have no particular meaning in the religion and are not considered sacraments; they are performed only at the request of followers, including young people, who want to provide a religious dimension to the important moments of their lives. Funerals are also performed at the request of the concerned person, unless the family asks for rituals of another religion. The procession always takes place at the cemetery or the funeral home, and the deceased person is never brought to the temple. Desservants read the "Ten Principles of the Father", then an Antoinist text on reincarnation, to help the soul to come off the body to be reincarnated. Sociologists note that many people who never attend the Antoinist services asked for funeral rites of that religion.

=== Holidays ===
As Antoine decided to model Antoinist holidays on Catholicism, followers celebrate Christian holidays, including All Saints, Christmas, Easter, Easter Monday and Ascension; on these days, appropriate portions of Antoine's works are read during the services. There are also three special days in Antoinism, and attendance at worship is generally higher at these moments: (1) 25 June, the Father's Day. It was established by Antoine's wife shortly after his death. At first, from 1913, all the temples except the one in Jemeppe were closed that day in the purpose that followers came to attend the ceremony in that city. So many Antoinists performed a pilgrimage to Jemeppe-sur-Meuse to participate in a procession through the city which outlined the main events of Antoine's life. The procession was withdrawn in 1937 and the pilgrimage seems to be no longer organized. That day, the faithful pay homage to the founder in the temples. (2) 15 August, the consecration of the temple's Day, which commemorates the consecration of the first temple. In 1911, on that day, the General Operation took place at the temple, then the ceremony continued into a public hall, which shocked followers; therefore, the following year, the whole ceremony took place exclusively in the temple. (3) 3 November, the Mother's Day, as anniversary of Catherine's death.

=== Religious clothing and symbols ===
Wearing Antoinist religious clothing indicates an intense involvement in the religion by the person who makes this choice. Although not mandatory, it is devoted to faithful who perform the worship, celebrations and other tasks in the temple—all of them are called "moral work", as they are expected to participate in the moral elevation of followers. It was in 1906 that Antoine wore special clothes for the first time, and it was the case of the faithful in 1910. Entirely black, the dress for men was designed by Antoine, and that for women by Catherine, who precisely codified their dimensions in their writings. There are also dresses for young people of both sexes, but they are never actually worn. Historically, the wearing of the dress was the subject of a debate among the first Antoinists, some of them refusing to wear it, and even generated a scandal so that Antoine had to justify himself on this subject, saying it had been revealed by inspiration. In the past, the dress was also worn in the street, and that was how the followers were immediately identified by the public. Currently, it is generally only worn in the context of worship, and it is put and removed in the locker room of the temple. Clothing for men is composed of a dress which resembles the one worn by Catholic clergy in the monastery, and closed by 13 buttons, plus a cashmere top hat. Clothing for women is a wide dress accompanied with a cape and a bonnet with a veil. In the Antoinist view, the collar is important as it is believed that the fluid resides here.

The only emblem of Antoinism is the tree of science of the sight of evil that features on the facade of the highest platform in the temple. It has seven branches which represent the seven deadly sins (although sin is rejected in the religion), two eyes which symbolize the view of the sins, and the tree roots which are the symbol of the intelligence which links man to matter. In the branches the mention "Culte Antoiniste" ("Antoinist worship") is written.

== Organization ==
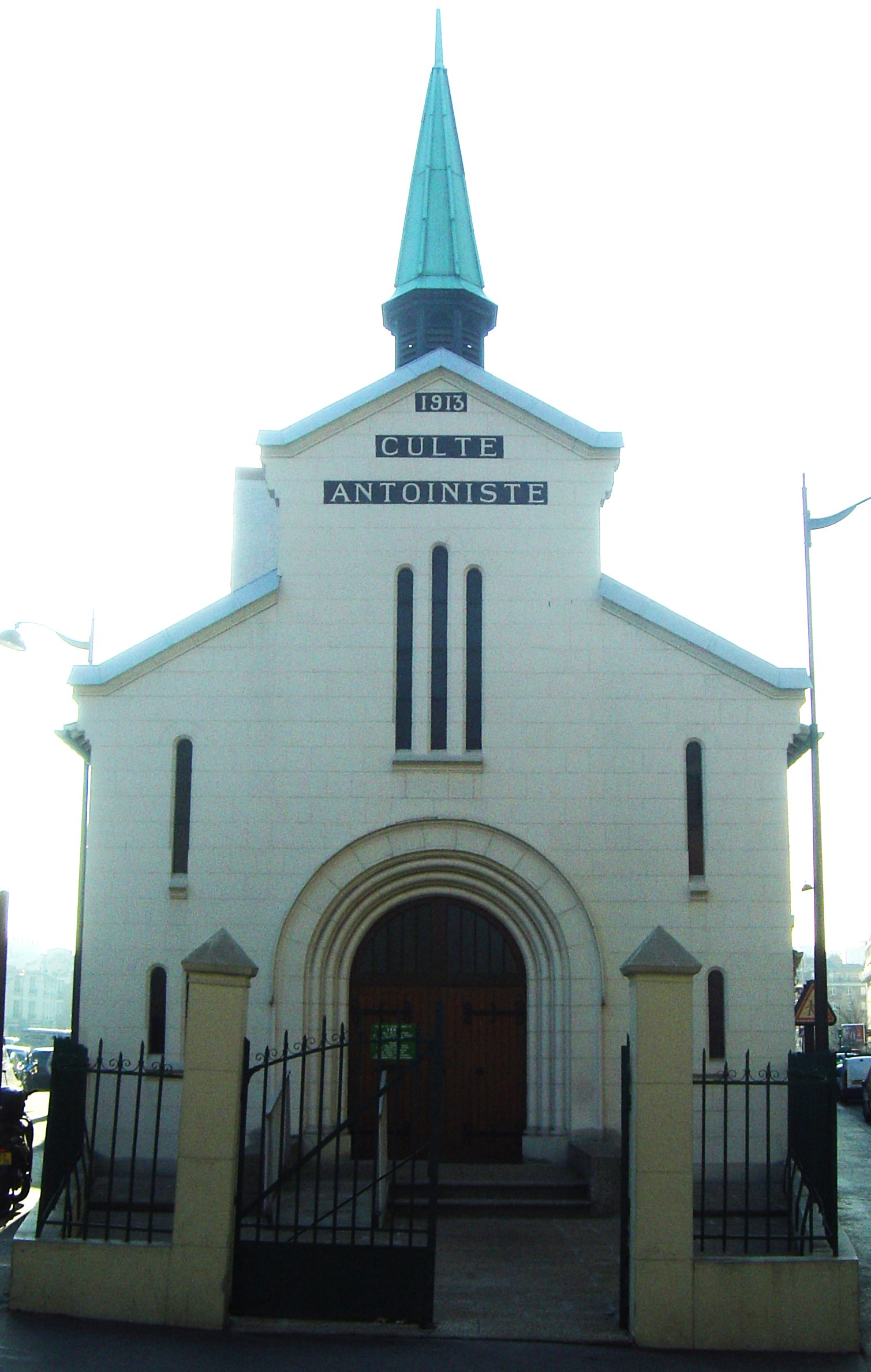
Antoinist temples, such as the one in the 13th arrondissement of Paris, are exempt from property taxes.

=== Status ===
In Belgium, the religion was organized as an association without lucrative purpose (asbl) in 1922 and was immediately registered as organism of public utility on a request of the Department of Justice. It is not recognized as a public worship, because there is no worship of a deity in the ceremonies. Currently headed by a college of desservants, the religion is legally registered as religious association in France. It was published in the Journal Officiel de la République Française of 9 February 1924, and the last modification of the statutes appeared in the JO of 3 August 1988. Antoinist worship has been exempt from property taxes on the public part of its buildings since 1925 in Belgium and in France since 1934.

=== Places of worship ===
The temples are Antoinism's only place of worship. They are financed with anonymous donations and patronages, and often members participate in the construction. They are all consecrated prior to their use for worship, which means that, at a ceremony, they received a "good fluid" by one of the founders when they were alive or by a duly authorized follower.

The exterior facade displays an architecture which can be variable according to the temples, but always includes the words "Antoinist Worship" ("Culte Antoiniste") and the year of the building consecration. At the entrance, there is a porch where various writings of the religious movement, the internal regulations (in France only), the list of the places of worship and the holidays, as well as photos of the Antoine couple and of the various temples, are exhibited behind display windows.

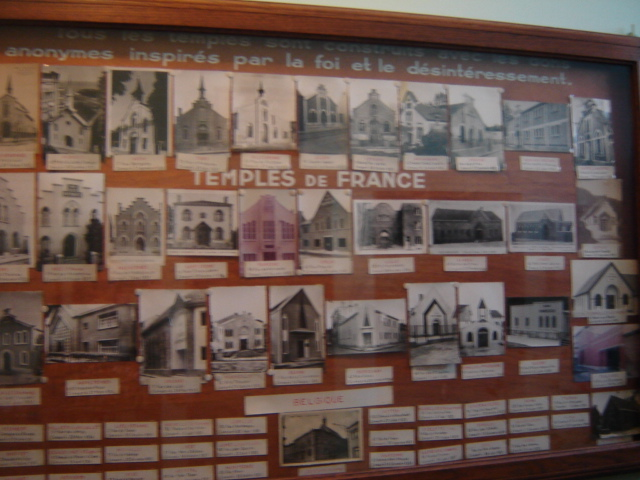
Photographs of the Antoinist temples, exhibited in the porch of each temple

The inside walls are always painted green, as a symbol of reincarnation. There is no decoration, and small papers on the walls indicate to visitors that they should not speak in the temple. Several rows of wooden benches separated by a center aisle are devoted to the faithful and visitors. They face a two-floor platform, where the worship is performed, and a text called "The Halo of Consciousness" ("L'Auréore de la Conscience"), which is written on the back wall. In France only, the highest platform is adorned, from left to right, with a representation of the "tree of science of the sight of evil", the Antoinist symbol, then a photo of Antoine and another one of Catherine; the photo of the Father is slightly higher than the other two. On the left and the right, side rooms of around 15 m^{3} are used as consulting offices whose walls are orned with five tables; the most impressive of them is Antoine's image. There is also a cloakroom and, adjacent to the temple, a small apartment continuously occupied by an Antoinist healer.

The movement also owns reading rooms, but no worship is celebrated in these places. As of 2011, Antoinism counts 64 temples: 32 in Belgium, 31 in France and 1 in the Principality of Monaco. In 1993, there were reading rooms in Belgium, Metropolitan France, Réunion, Guadeloupe, Australia, Brazil, Italy, Congo and Luxembourg. A reading room in Egypt was quickly closed in November 1913.

=== Publications ===
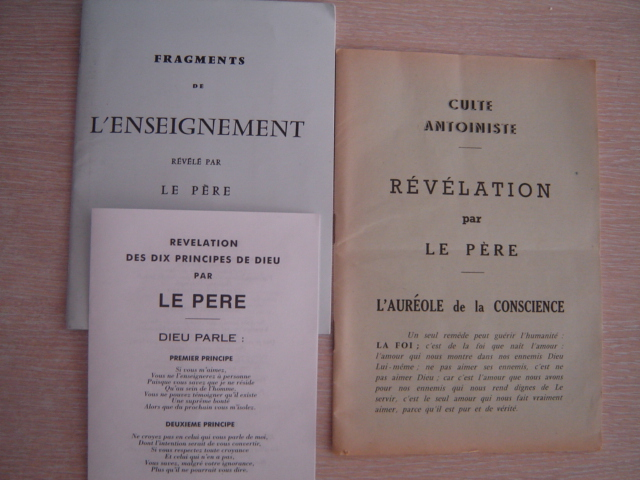
Three Antoinist booklets which contain some excerpts of Antoine's books

The Antoinist literature is mainly composed of Antoine's writings, which are considered as sacred by followers and should not be modified. They include three doctrinal books grouped into two volumes which are sold in the temples and read during the worship: Revelation of the Father (La Révélation par le Père), The Coronation of the Revealed Work (Le Couronnement de l'Œuvre révélée) and Development of the Teaching of Father (Le Développement de l'Enseignement du Père). According to Debouxhtay, "the writings of Antoine do not shine by their qualities of style", a view shared by other observers. Many statements from the Antoines are gathered into 14 books called Tomes, which remain only accessible to dressed members. From May 1907 to April 1909, the religion published the journal The Halo of Consciousness, then from September 1911 to August 1914, The Unitive. In 1936, Belgian writer Robert Vivier published a hagiographic biography—although based on real facts—of Louis Antoine, which is also used by Antoinists to strengthen their faith, and thus sold in the temples.

=== Hierarchy and financial issues ===
The organization, which is the most reduced as possible, is slightly different in France and Belgium:

In Belgium, a General Council was organized in 1911 by Antoine to manage all material issues. It is currently composed of nine members including a chairman, a treasurer and a secretary. The founction of the First Representative of the Father was abolished in 1971, and there are no internal regulations in the temples. In France, the movement is led by a religious association called "Culte Antoiniste" ("Antoinist Worship"). All the desservants are part of a College of Desservants which manage the material issues, and whose decisions are implemented by an Administrative Committee. Within the college, a Moral Secretary is elected and serves as legal representative of the religion. Locally, the desservants nominate auxiliaries among the dressed followers so that they perform reading during worship and/or serve as healers. A Council of Local Interior composed of seven members including desservants is used for issues related to the temple on which it depends. Women as well as men can be chosen as ministers, as Catherine promoted gender equality in the worship. In all cases, Antoine, although deceased, remains the leader of the religion, which led Debouxhtay to compare him to the Pope in the Catholic Church.

Antoinist healers are always dressed members, and are not paid. They do not attend specific training or receive any initiation rite. Those who want to access this function must feel spiritually "inspired" and obtain the desservant's approval. They must also promise to respect Antoinist rules including nondisclosure of confessions by consultants and not discouraging traditional medicine. Before receiving consultants, no kind of asceticism is required, but mental preparation includes prayer and meditation. Regarded as mere intercessors, healers have a "charisma of function" as they reproduce that of Antoine, which does not prevent some healers from becoming very popular among consultants.

Worship is practiced voluntarily, and desservants and dressed followers are not paid, neither for worship, nor for consultations. The religion sells nothing except the sacred books, and refuses any form of contribution and any will made by a person who still has a family. When the founding couple was living, donations were rejected when the religion had enough money in its treasury. Only anonymous donations and bequests are accepted, and they go to the "Antoinist worship"'s treasury. In Belgium, the finances, which have been published in Le Moniteur Belge every year after the Council meeting, are on the decline and show a minimal activity of the religion.

=== Membership ===
There are four categories of Antoinists: desservants who perform worship, people who wear the religious clothing, regular faithful who attend the service every week, and occasional members or visitors. As its aim is to heal and comfort through faith, Antoinism does not seek to convert new people. The number of followers is difficult to assess as there are no statistics established by the religion. After a period of rapid growth in Belgium, the number of followers is currently on the decline in the country and some temples were forced to close due to lack of money or faithful; for example, in 2003, Human Rights Without Frontiers counted less than 150 worshipers in the country. In France, however, the religion remains active and counts about 2,500 regular members. Estimates of the worldwide membership vary from few thousand to 200,000. The future growth of the number of followers, however, can be affected by certain rules of the group. As it does not practice proselytism, Antoinism suffers from a lack of social visibility and many people are unaware even of Antoinist temples in their neighborhood. Moreover, because of the availability required for worship and the absence of income in the religion, dressed members and desservants are often old-age retired people.

Mainly composed of 40- to 50-year-old people and a majority of women, the membership is almost the same as that which was attracted by Spiritism in Belgium in the 19th century. The followers have mostly modest social status, such as miners and artisans, and are generally people interested in spirituality, but who are at odds with the Catholic Church or display a skeptical attitude towards traditional medicine. Antoinists are also sometimes Jews, Muslims, Buddhists, adepts of reiki, yoga, or tai chi, or former Catholics. An accurate depiction of Antoinists of Northern France was made by writer André Thérive in his 1928 novel Without Soul (Sans âme). In 1945, Debouxhtay described followers as "very kind, very charitable and very obliging people".

== Reception ==
=== Growth and criticism ===
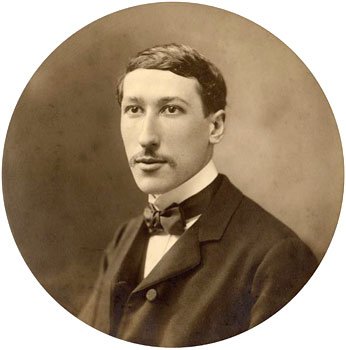
René Guénon was critical of Antoinist doctrines in his 1923 book, The Spiritist Fallacy.

When Antoine died in 1912, there were fewer than a thousand followers and thousands of supporters; in the 1920s, the number of followers rose to 700,000, including 300,000 in Belgium. During its first decades, Antoinism spread so fast that even American newspapers published articles about the religion, one of them stating that it "[was] attracting considerable attention in Europe". Author Françoise d'Eaubonne considered that the physique of Antoine, which she found attractive, may have contributed to his success. According to Bégot, the success of Antoinist healing in the early 20th century can be explained by the fact that "it offered an alternative to the legitimate institutions of control of body and soul", i.e. the Catholic Church and medicine. She added: "Carrier of a social protest, it is nevertheless a way of socioeconomic integration". French historian and sociologist Émile Poulat stated that the religion "has always appeared calm and beneficient".

As it disapproved that the group of Antoine turned away from Spiritism, journals from Spiritist circles criticized Antoinism in its beginnings, and the president of the Belgian Federation of Spiritist (Fédération spirite de Belgique) Chevalier Clement Saint-Marcq considered the religion as one of the "parasitic stems came on the healthy and strong tree of Spiritism". From a philosophical standpoint, Antoinism was criticized by René Guénon in an entire chapter of his 1923 book The Spiritist Fallacy (L'Erreur spirite), noting, to his point of view, "the nullity of [Antoine's] "teachings" which are only a vague mixture of spiritualist theories and Protestant "moralism"". As for Theosophists, they displayed a strong fellow feeling to Antoinism in their journals.

The religion received little opposition from the Catholic Church, which has sometimes criticized it but only on doctrinal issues, considering it heretic. For example, in 1918, Liège priest Hubert Bourguet published a 50-page brochure in which he expressed concerns on the doctrines, qualified the sacred texts of Antoinism as "gibberish" and concluded that Antoine would have suffered from paraphrenia. In 1925, Father Lucien Roure considered Antoinism "a doctrine of anarchy and amorality", with "negative teachings", confused and incoherent writings, and "credulous and docile" followers. In 1949, author Jacques Michel blamed Antoine for having substituted himself for Jesus Christ and deemed Antoinism a "demonic" faith. Later, in 1953, Maurice Colinon, then in 1954, the Father Henri-Charles Chéry, published books which analyzed non-conformist groups, including Antoinism. According to Debouxhtay, Protestants were concerned about the Antoinist expansion in the 1930s, and several pastors published writings on this subject (Giron-Galzin, 1910; Rumpf, 1917; Wyss, c.1924). More recently, the religion was studied from a Protestant perspective by pastor Gérard Dagon.

=== Classification ===
In France, the Antoinist worship was classified as a cult in the 1995 parliamentary reports which considered it one of the oldest healer groups. Books published by Belgian and French anti-cult associations and activists sometimes included Antoinism in their lists of cults, such as Cults, State of Emergency—Better know them, better defend oneself in France and worldwide (Les Sectes, État d'urgence—Mieux les connaître, mieux s'en défendre en France et dans le monde), published by the Centre Roger Ikor, and others. However, on 27 May 2005, the 1995 annex of the French report and cult classifications in which the Antoinist worship was listed, were officially cancelled and invalidated by Jean-Pierre Raffarin's circulaire. In addition, in a 1984 letter, the French Minister of the Interior wrote that the movement was considered, from an administrative point of view, as having for exclusive purpose the exercise of a religion, thus complying with the 18th and 19th Articles of the 1905 French law on the Separation of the Churches and the State. He added that Antoinism had always been allowed to receive bequests or donations, which meant that its religious nature was never challenged. In the early 2000s, membership of an Antoinist mother in Valenciennes was used by her former husband to remove from her the custody of their son; the decision received attention from media and was criticized by the French sociologist Régis Dericquebourg as being unjustified.

When heard by the Belgian commission on cults, philosopher Luc Nefontaine said that "the establishment of a directory of cult movements (...) seems to him dangerous, because it would also give a bad image of quite honourable organizations such as (...) Antoinism". Eric Brasseur, director of Centre for information and advice on harmful cultish organizations (Centre d'information et d'avis sur les organisations sectaires nuisibles, or CIAOSN) said: "This is a Belgian worship for which we have never had a complaint in 12 years, a rare case to report". Similarly, in 2013, the Interministerial Mission for Monitoring and Combatting Cultic Deviances (Mission interministérielle de vigilance et de lutte contre les dérives sectaires, or MIVILUDES) made this comment: "We have never received reporting from Antoinists. They heal through prayer, but as long as they do not prevent people from getting proper treatment by legal means..." In addition, the Renseignements généraux stopped monitoring the religion given the absence of any problem. In 2002, the national service "Pastoral, sects and new beliefs" ("Pastorale, sectes et nouvelles croyances"), which analyses new religious movements from a catholic point of view, wrote about Antoinism: "Although listed among the cults in the 1995 Parliamentary Report, it has no cultish feature." Similarly, Dericquebourg, who deeply studied the religious group, concluded that Antoinism is not a cult: it "has no totalitarian influence on its members, and do not dictate their behaviour to get in the world; it is not exclusive [and] shows no hostility towards social systems". According to Bégot, the group is a "cult" in the sociological language (not to be confused with the pejorative word "cult"), characterized by a mystical experience, a break with the dominant religious tradition, and primacy of the individual on social issues; it has both magical and ethical dimensions.

Although it does not refer directly to the Gospel, Antoinism is often considered a Christian-based new religious movement. In 1970, British sociologist Bryan Wilson classified Antoinism in the category of "thaumaturgical sects". Secretary of the French episcopate for the study of cults and new religious movements Jean Vernette also deemed the group a "healer church" and "a new religion of Spiritism, Theosophy and elements of Christianity". Le Protestant Liégeois, a Belgian Protestant periodical, said that the group, although listed as a cult in the 1995 parliamentary report, was "rather a philosophical and religious movement". In an encyclopedia about sects, the journalist Xavier Pasquini qualified Antoinism a "genuine Theosophical religion", and stated that it "does not ask for money from its followers, and does not practice excessive indoctrination".

== See also ==
- Belgium in "the long nineteenth century"
- List of Antoinist temples
- New religious movement
- Religion in Belgium
- Spiritism
- Auguste Henri Jacob

== Bibliography ==
- Anti-cults perspective
  - Centre Roger Ikor (1995). "Antoinisme". Les Sectes, État d'urgence—Mieux les connaître, mieux s'en défendre en France et dans le monde (in French). Paris: Albin Michel. ISBN 2-226-07711-1.
  - Lallemand, Alain (1994). "Du spiritisme à l'antoinisme". Les sectes en Belgique et au Luxembourg (in French). Brussel: EPO. ISBN 2-87262-089-3.
- Historical perspective
  - Boffy, Jean-Marc (1997). Historique du Culte antoiniste. Louis Antoine et l'antoinisme (in French). Jemeppe-sur-Meuse: Culte antoiniste.
  - Debouxhtay, Pierre (1934). Antoine le guérisseur et l'Antoinisme (in French). Liège: Fernand Gothier.
  - Debouxhtay, Pierre (1945). L'Antoinisme (in French). La Pensée catholique.
  - Delorme, Philippe (2002). "6: Lous Antoine (1846–1912)". Les Aventuriers de Dieu (in French). Paris: Jean Picollec. pp. 193–226. ISBN 2-86477-190-X.
  - Vivier, Robert (1936). Délivrez-nous du mal—Antoine le guérisseur (in French) (1989 ed.). Brussel: Labor. ISBN 978-2-246-02082-0.
- Philosophical perspective
  - Cécius, Jacques (2009). Une religion de guérison : l'Antoinisme (in French).
  - Guénon, René (1977). "L'Antoinisme". L'Erreur spirite (in French). Paris: Éditions traditionnelles. ISBN 2-7138-0059-5.
  - Lesourd, Paul (1973). "Chapitre 3: Les Antoinistes". Solutions religieuses autres que les grandes religions pour les âmes à la recherche de Dieu—Les religions minoritaires et les mouvements philosophico-spiritualistes (in French). Presses de la Cité.
- Religious perspective
  - Bourguet, Hubert (1918). Antoine de Jemeppe et l'Antoinisme (in French). Liège: Vaillant-Carmanne.
  - Chéry, Henri-Charles (1954). L'Offensive des sectes (in French). Paris: Cerf.
  - Colinon, Maurice (1953). "Le « Père Antoine » et l'Antoinisme". Faux prophètes et sectes d'aujourd'hui (in French). Paris: Plon.
  - Giltay, René (February 2011). "Sectes d'hier et d'aujourd'hui (13) – Le culte antoiniste" (PDF). Le Protestant Liégeois. Liège: Église Protestante Unie de Belgique: 6–9.
  - Michel, Jacques (1949). Antoine, l'Antoinisme, les Antoinistes (in French). Évreux: Librairie Saint-Paul.
  - Roure, Lucien (1925). "Un Prophète contemporain, Antoine le Guérisseur". Au pays de l'occultisme ou par delà le catholicisme (in French). Paris: Gabriel Beauchesne.
  - Van der Naillen, Albert (1927). Most sacred revelations given to the world by Antoine the wonderful Belgian healer. The Park Printing Co.
- Sociological perspective
  - Bégot, Anne-Cécile (1997). "Science Chrétienne et Antoinisme: Deux groupes religieux minoritaires". Socio-anthropologie (in French). 2. doi:10.4000/socio-anthropologie.37.
  - Bégot, Anne-Cécile (2000). "Les Mutations de la représentation du divin au sein d'un groupe à vocation thérapeutique, Le cas de l'antoinisme". Archives de sciences sociales des religions (in French). 111: 41–55. doi:10.4000/assr.20222.
  - Bégot, Anne-Cécile (February 2008). "La construction sociale de l'efficacité thérapeutique au sein de groupes religieux" (PDF). Ethnographiques (in French) (15).
  - Bergeron, Richard; Ouellet, Bertrand (1998). "La guérison spirituelle: son évolution face aux changements sociaux et culturels — Étude comparée de la Science chrétienne et de l'antoinisme". Croyances et sociétés: communications présentées au dixième colloque international sur les nouveaux mouvements religieux (in French). Montreal: Fides. pp. 187–98. ISBN 2-7621-1990-1.
  - Dericquebourg, Régis (1993). Les Antoinistes (in French). Belgium: Brepols. ISBN 2-503-50325-X.
  - Dericquebourg, Régis (1993). "La thérapie spirituelle antoiniste". Syzygy, Center for Academic Publication (in French). 2, n°1–2. Stanford University Branch: Lewis. Archived from the original on 24 September 2015.
  - Dericquebourg, Régis (2001). "L'Antoinisme". Croire et guérir—Quatre religions de guérison (in French). Dervy. ISBN 2-84454-076-7.
  - Dericquebourg, Régis (2002). "L'Antoinisme". Dictionnaire des miracles et de l'extraordinaire (in French). Paris: Fayard. pp. 42–44. ISBN 2-213-61394-X. Archived from the original on 21 September 2011.
  - Massé, Raymond; Benoist, Jean (2002). "Formes organisationnelles et pratiques thérapeutiques au sein de la Science chrétienne et de l'antoinisme". Convocations thérapeutiques du sacré (in French). Paris: Karthala. pp. 61–78. ISBN 2-84586-266-0.
