= Mons-lez-Liège =

Coordinates: 50°37′N 05°27′E

Mons-lez-Liege (Walloon: Mont-dlé-Lidje) is a village of Wallonia and a district of the municipality of Flémalle, located in the province of Liège, Belgium.

The town was also known under the name of Mons-Crotteux until 1977.

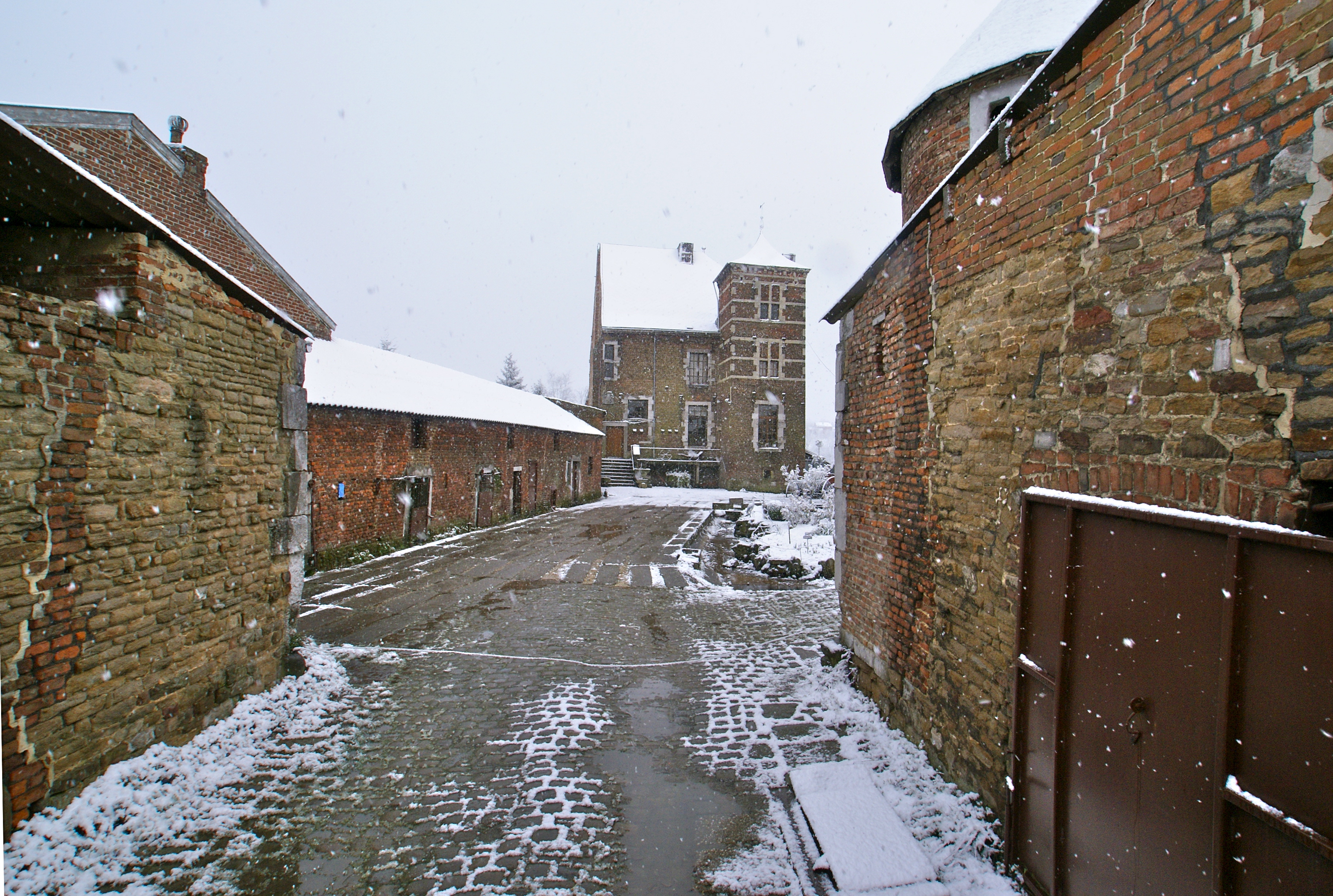
The castle in Mons-lez-Liège

It was a separate municipality before the merging of municipalities in 1977. The hamlet of Cahottes was part of Horion-Hozémont until then, but was transferred to Mons-lez-Liège.

It is the birthplace of Louis Antoine, in 1846. He founded the Antoinism in Jemeppe-sur-Meuse in 1910.
