= Horion-Hozémont =

Coordinates: 50°37′49″N 5°22′47″E

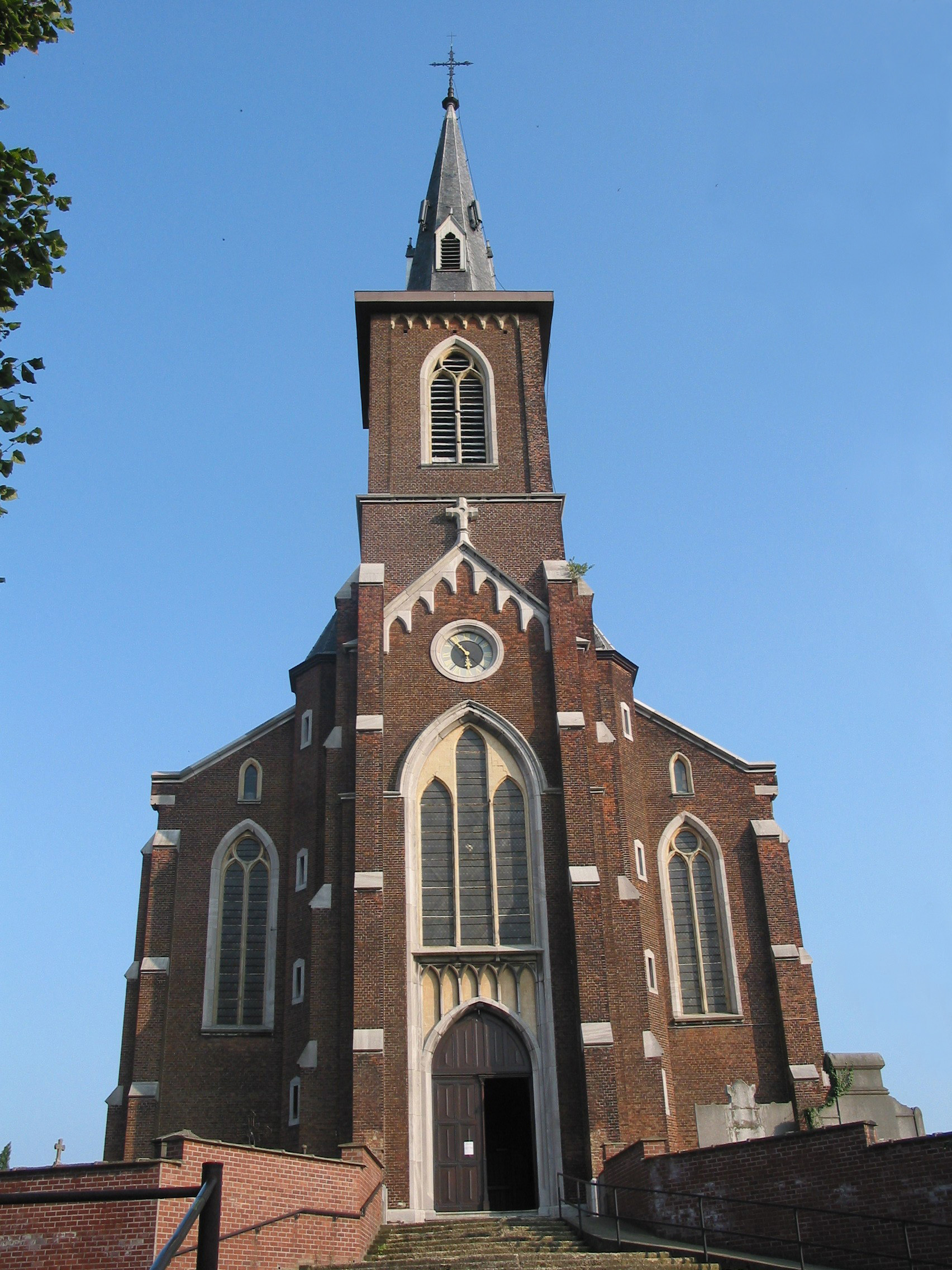
Saint-Sauveur church

Horion-Hozémont (French pronunciation: [ɔʁjɔ̃ ozemɔ̃]) is a village of Wallonia and a district of the municipality of Grâce-Hollogne, located in the province of Liège, Belgium.

Horion-Hozémont was its own municipality until January 1, 1977 when it was merged with Grâce-Hollogne as part of the fusion of municipalities in Belgium. The hamlet of Cahottes was part of Horion-Hozémont until then, but was transferred to the Mons-lez-Liège district of the municipality of Flémalle. Horion-Hozémont's postal code is 4460.

== Notable residents ==
- François Jacqmin (1929-1992), poet, born in Horion-Hozémont
- John Wartique (born 1990), racing driver, born in Horion-Hozémont
