= Grâce-Hollogne =

Municipality in Liège Province, Wallonia, Belgium

Grâce-Hollogne Gråce-Hologne (Walloon)
- Municipality
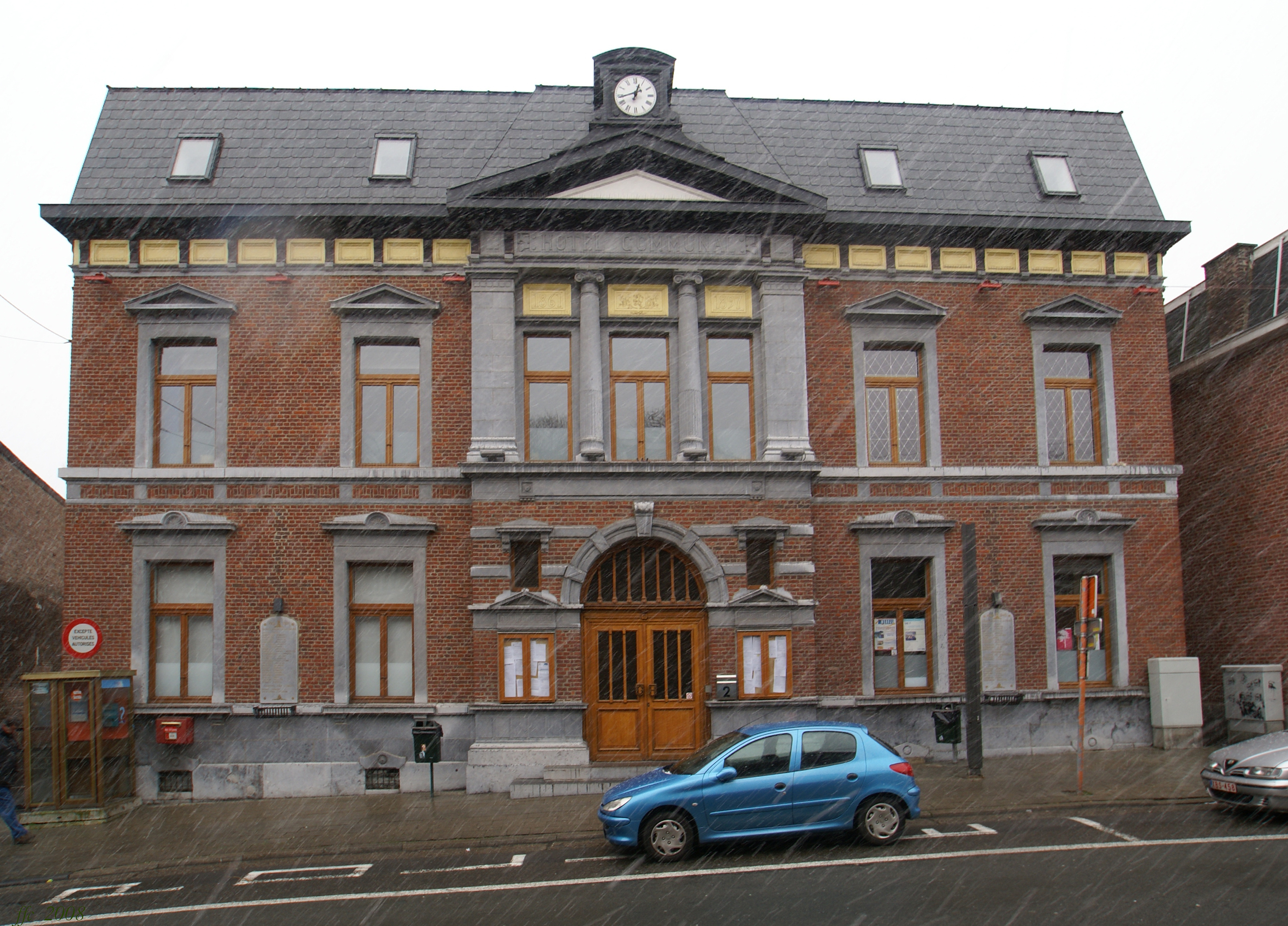
- Town hall

- Flag Coat of arms

- Location of Grâce-Hollogne in Liège province
- Interactive map of Grâce-Hollogne
- Location in Belgium
- Coordinates: 50°37′57″N 05°28′37″E
- Country: Belgium
- Community: French Community
- Region: Wallonia
- Province: Liège
- Arrondissement: Liège

Government
  - Mayor: Maurice Mottard
  - Governing party: PS

Area
  - Total: 34.17 km^{2} (13.19 sq mi)

Population (2018-01-01)
  - Total: 22,541
  - Density: 659.7/km^{2} (1,709/sq mi)
- Postal codes: 4460
- NIS code: 62118
- Area codes: 04
- Website: www.grace-hollogne.be

Grâce-Hollogne (French: [ɡʁɑs ɔlɔɲ]; Walloon: Gråce-Hologne) is a municipality of Wallonia, Belgium, located in the province of Liège. The municipality is effectively a part of the greater Liège conurbation, separated from Liège city centre by the municipality of Saint-Nicolas. Included within its boundaries is Liège Airport.

On 1 January 2006 Grâce-Hollogne had a total population of 21,753. The total area is 34.24 km^{2}, which gives a population density of approximately 635 inhabitants per km^{2}.

== Geography ==
The municipality consists of the following districts: Bierset, Grâce-Berleur, Hollogne-aux-Pierres, Horion-Hozémont, and Velroux.

== History ==
Grâce-Hollogne was formed by the grouping of former municipalities Bierset, Grâce-Berleur, Hollogne-aux-Pierres, Horion-Hozémont, and Velroux, along with part of Mons-lez-Liège.

The killing of four demonstrators on 30 July 1950 in Grâce-Berleur was one of the most significant moments in the so-called Royal Question of 1950, which grew out of resentment towards King Leopold III and his actions in World War II.

In June 1995, Julie Lejeune and Mélissa Russo were abducted from Grâce-Hollogne to become victims of serial killer and child molester Marc Dutroux. One of the municipality's schools is now named École Julie et Melissa in honour of the murdered girls, and flowers are still left regularly on the Julie & Melissa Monument.

== Economy ==
Avient Aviation had its Continental Europe offices on the property of Liège Airport.

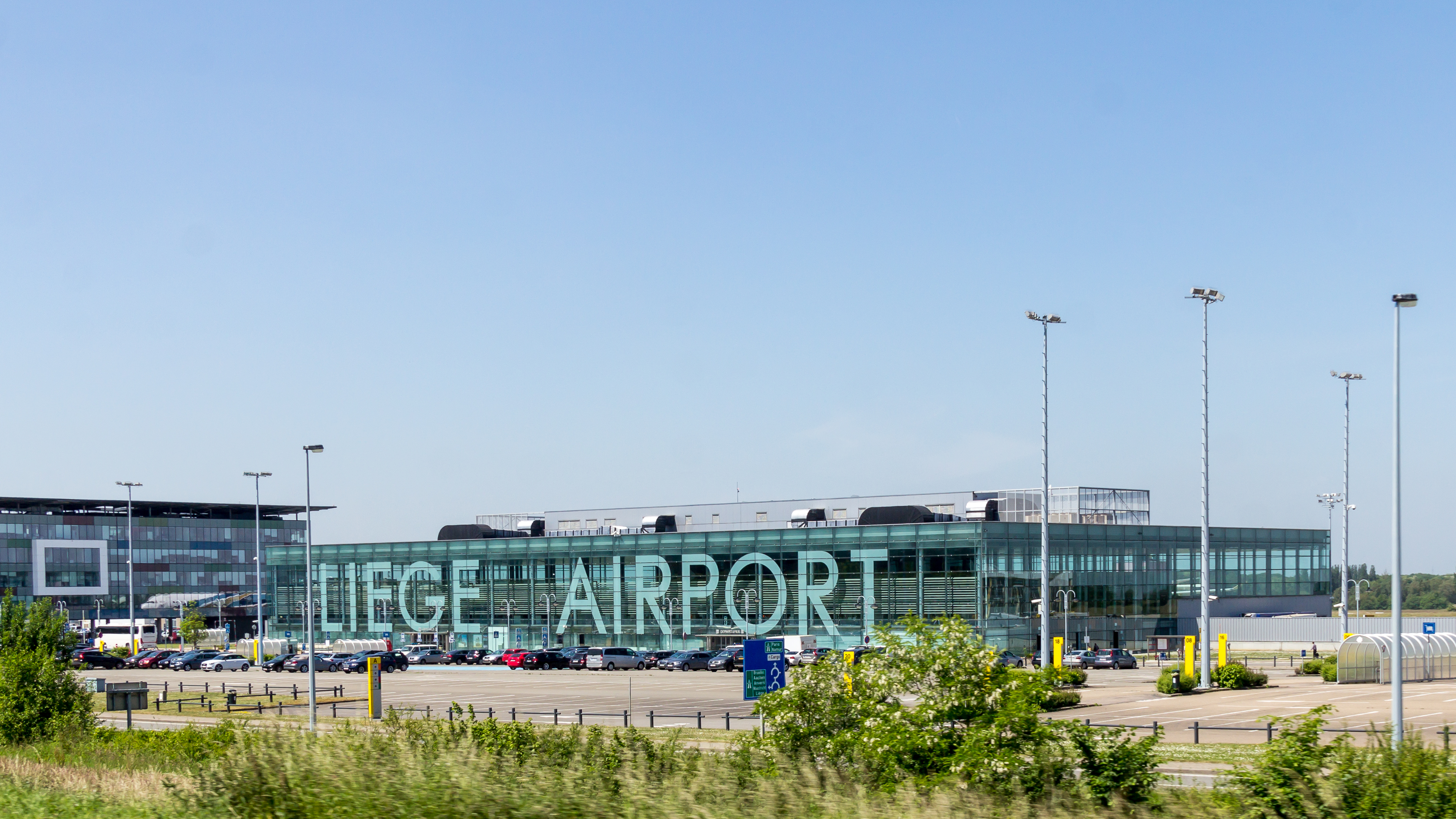
Liège Airport

== See also ==
- List of protected heritage sites in Grâce-Hollogne
