= List of protected heritage sites in Saint-Nicolas, Belgium =

This table shows an overview of the protected heritage sites in the Walloon town Saint-Nicolas, Belgium. This list is part of Belgium's national heritage.

| Object | Year/architect | Town/section | Address | Coordinates | Number^{?} | Image |
|---|---|---|---|---|---|---|
| Torette house ^{(nl)} ^{(fr)} | | Saint-Nicolas | rue Chiff' d'Or, n°81 | 50.619798°N 5.535115°E | 62093-CLT-0001-01 Info | Huis Torette |
| Planchard house ^{(nl)} ^{(fr)} | | Saint-Nicolas | rue Winston Churchill, n°53 | 50.645247°N 5.528016°E | 62093-CLT-0002-01 Info | Huis Planchard: gevels en daken |
| House of the People (Peuple) ^{(nl)} ^{(fr)} | | Saint-Nicolas | | 50.640817°N 5.514225°E | 62093-CLT-0003-01 Info | Huis van Peuple: voorgevel en dakhelling |
| Organ of the Church Saint-Hubert te Tilleur ^{(nl)} ^{(fr)} | | Saint-Nicolas | | 50.619812°N 5.527047°E | 62093-CLT-0004-01 Info | |
| Old city hall of Montegnée ^{(nl)} ^{(fr)} | | Saint-Nicolas | rue des Botresses, n°2 | 50.641365°N 5.519899°E | 62093-CLT-0005-01 Info | Oude stadhuis van Montegnée: gevels en daken |

== See also ==
- List of protected heritage sites in Liège (province)
- Saint-Nicolas, Belgium
