= List of protected heritage sites in Grâce-Hollogne =

This table shows an overview of the protected heritage sites in the Walloon town Grâce-Hollogne. This list is part of Belgium's national heritage.

Object	Year/architect	Town/section	Address	Coordinates	Number^{?}	Image
Border marker called "Perron" ^{(nl)} ^{(fr)}		Grâce-Hollogne	located on the main road Liege-Hannut, at the exit called "Rue Joseph Wauters' in Bierset	50.653873°N 5.440390°E	62118-CLT-0001-01 Info	
The tower of the old castle Bierst ^{(nl)} ^{(fr)}		Grâce-Hollogne		50.656009°N 5.453029°E	62118-CLT-0002-01 Info	
The church of Saint-Pierre-aux-Pierres ^{(nl)} ^{(fr)}		Grâce-Hollogne		50.638367°N 5.473854°E	62118-CLT-0004-01 Info	De kerk van Saint-Pierre te Hollogne-aux-Pierres
The Romanesque chapel and the farm near Lexhy castle ^{(nl)} ^{(fr)}		Grâce-Hollogne		50.632292°N 5.396885°E	62118-CLT-0006-01 Info	
The tower of the church of Saint-Andre Velroux ^{(nl)} ^{(fr)}		Grâce-Hollogne		50.644151°N 5.425025°E	62118-CLT-0007-01 Info	De toren van de kerk van Saint-André te Velroux

== See also ==
- List of protected heritage sites in Liège (province)
- Grâce-Hollogne
