= Robert Vivier =

Belgian poet and writer

Robert Vivier (1894–1989) was a Belgian poet, novelist, essayist, biographer and literary critic who wrote in French.

He published his first poetry collection, Le Menetrier, in 1924, which was followed by Dechirures (1927), Au bord du temps (1937), Le Miracle enferme (1939), Trace par l'oubli (1951), Chronos reve (1959) and S'étonner d'être (1977). His anxious listening to everyday life, his nostalgia for the childhood of the world, his meditations on the "glory of life" and the "very sweet eternity that breathes the world" are expressed in free verses or very classical verses (sometimes sonnets), whose cuts he redistributes according to very personal musical laws. According to the New Princeton Encyclopedia of Poetry & Poetics his poetry is characterised by "discreet interrogation". It is described by Jean-Luc Wauthier as displaying "acute and sensuous surreality" and being "deceptively transparent, streaked with paradoxically calm anxiety".

He also wrote novels including Non (1931), Folle qui s'ennuie (1933) and Mesures pour rien, which Lucien Christophe and Herman Teirlinck praise for the author's "keenness of perception" in their depiction of "simple, empty" characters. A later novel is Avec les hommes, set during the First World War. One of his influences was the Belgian novelist, André Baillon (1875–1932).

Vivier's nonfiction works include biographies of Louis Antoine, the founder of Antoinism, the poet Charles Baudelaire, and the artist Marcel-Louis Baugniet. His critical works include Et la poésie fut langage (1954) on La Chanson de Roland, Villon, Racine, Verlaine and Mallarmé, and Frères du Ciel (1962) on poetic interpretations of the Icarus and Phaethon myths.

He held professorships in literature at the University of Liège and the Sorbonne, and was a member of the Royal Academy of French Language and Literature of Belgium (1950–89).
