= Hollogne-aux-Pierres =

Coordinates: 50°38′20″N 5°28′28″E

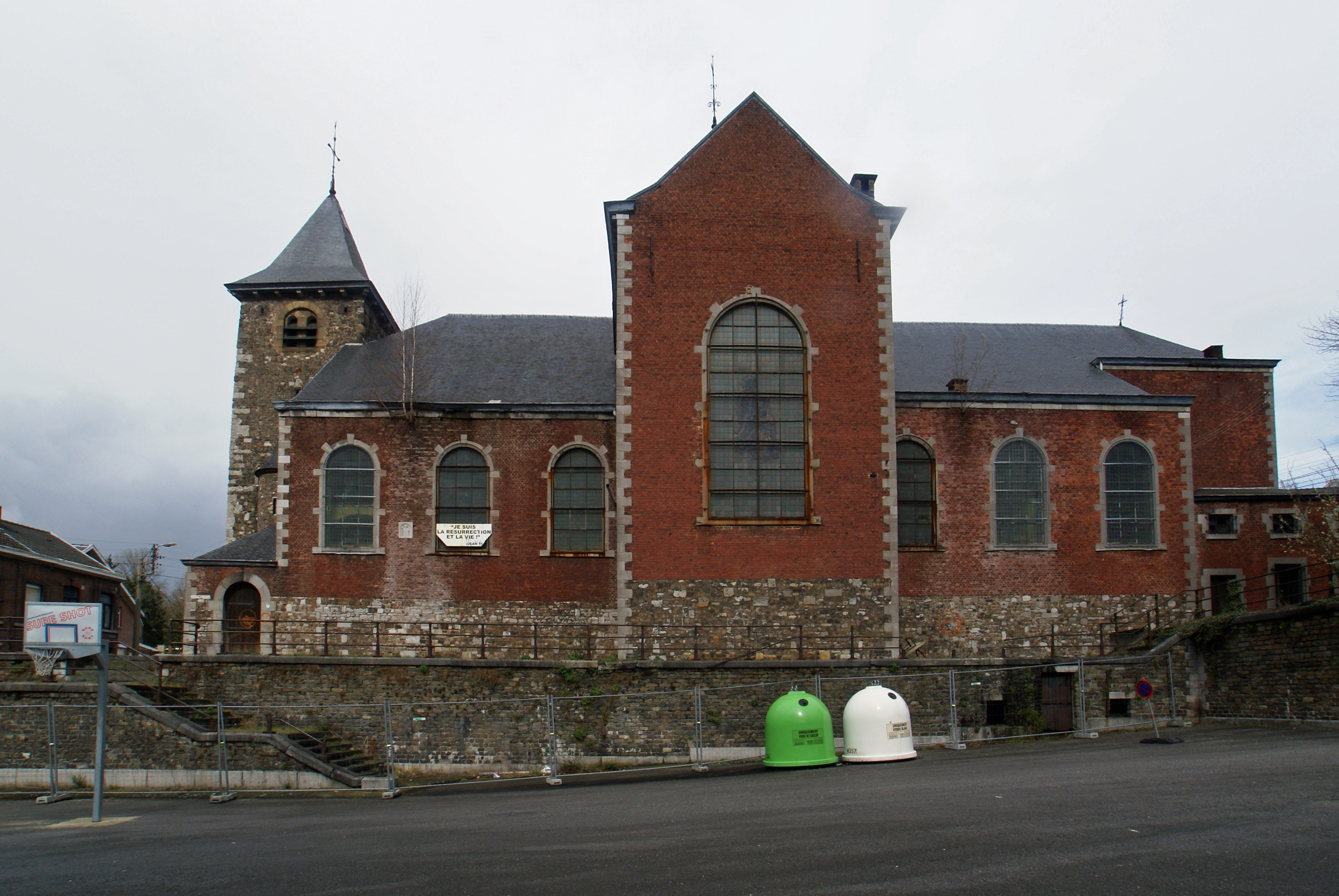
Grâce-Hollogne (Belgium): Saint Peter's Church

Hollogne-aux-Pierres (French pronunciation: [ɔlɔɲ o pjɛʁ]; Walloon: Hologne-ås-Pires) is a village of Wallonia and a district of the municipality of Grâce-Hollogne, located in the province of Liège, Belgium.

It was a municipality of its own before its fusion with Grâce-Berleur on July 10, 1970.

It is in this area that the police, on 30 July 1950, opened fire on the inhabitants of Grâce-Berleur, killing four people. This sad event is the tragic element which led to the end of the Royal Question.
