= Desservant =

Class of French parish priests

"Desservants" was the name of a class of French parish priests.

Under the old regime, a priest who performed the parochial duties in a vacant parish, or where the parish priest was under censure of some kind was known as a desservant; he was the vicar, or économe-curé, whom the Council of Trent desired to be appointed in each vacant parish.

After the Concordat of 1801, however, the name desservants was applied to a second class of parish priests who were named by the bishop without the sanction of the Government, but could also be removed at any time by the bishop. This institution owed its origin to custom rather than any law, though later on it was fully legalized. Article 9 of the new concordat decreed that "the bishops are to make a new circumscription of the parishes in their dioceses, which will only go into effect after the consent of the Government is obtained". Article 10 adds: "bishops shall make the appointments to parishes; they shall choose only persons approved by the Government." Finally, art. 14 provides "a suitable salary for bishops and parish priests".

These clauses applied to only one kind of parish and parish priests; but the Organic Articles, added by the Government to the concordat, established parishes of a second order, succursal parishes (mission churches), whose titulars were not canonically parish priests (curés) and received no remuneration from the State. Organic Articles 31, 60, 61, 63 provide that "there shall be at least one parish for every justice of the peace", that "the bishop in conjunction with the prefect shall regulate the number and extent of succursal parishes"; that "the officiating priests in succursal parishes shall be appointed by the bishop"; that they shall also be removable by him; preference nevertheless should be given to ecclesiastics pensioned by the Assemblee Constituante. By degrees the succursal parishes increased and equalled in number the municipalities of France; gradually, also, the Government allowed these desservants a small salary. From an ecclesiastical point of view, they were parish priests except for the removability clause.

This condition of affairs, which the concordat had not anticipated, was advantageous to the Church, because it left the bishops free to appoint to most parishes without consulting the State; it was also of advantage to the episcopal administration, which would have been much hampered had all the parish priests been irremovable. It was not formally approved by Rome, however, until May, 1845, under Pope Gregory XVI (reply of the Congregation of the Council to the Bishop of Liège). The pope authorized the continuance of the existing situation until the Holy See decided otherwise. From various quarters, however, arose protests in favour of canonical irremovability of the desservants. In 1839 the Allignol brothers published a survey of the condition of the desservants. It was the cause of several meetings of the French bishops at Rome and finally of the aforesaid rescript of Gregory XVI. Later the Congregation of Bishops and Regulars reproved a similar work by the Abbé Dagomer, "Réhabilitation du desservant". Occasionally, some of the desservants refused to give up their places at the bishop's order, maintaining a common-law right of irremovability; but in this they were always unsuccessful. In this respect the ecclesiastical discipline of France had become fixed and accepted; nor was it modified by the Separation Law of 1905; except that some bishops ceased to use the terms succursale and desservant, replacing them by "parish" and "parish priest", both, however, long since in ordinary ecclesiastical use.
