= Tilleur =

Coordinates: 50°37′15″N 5°31′48″E

Tilleur Tileu (Walloon)
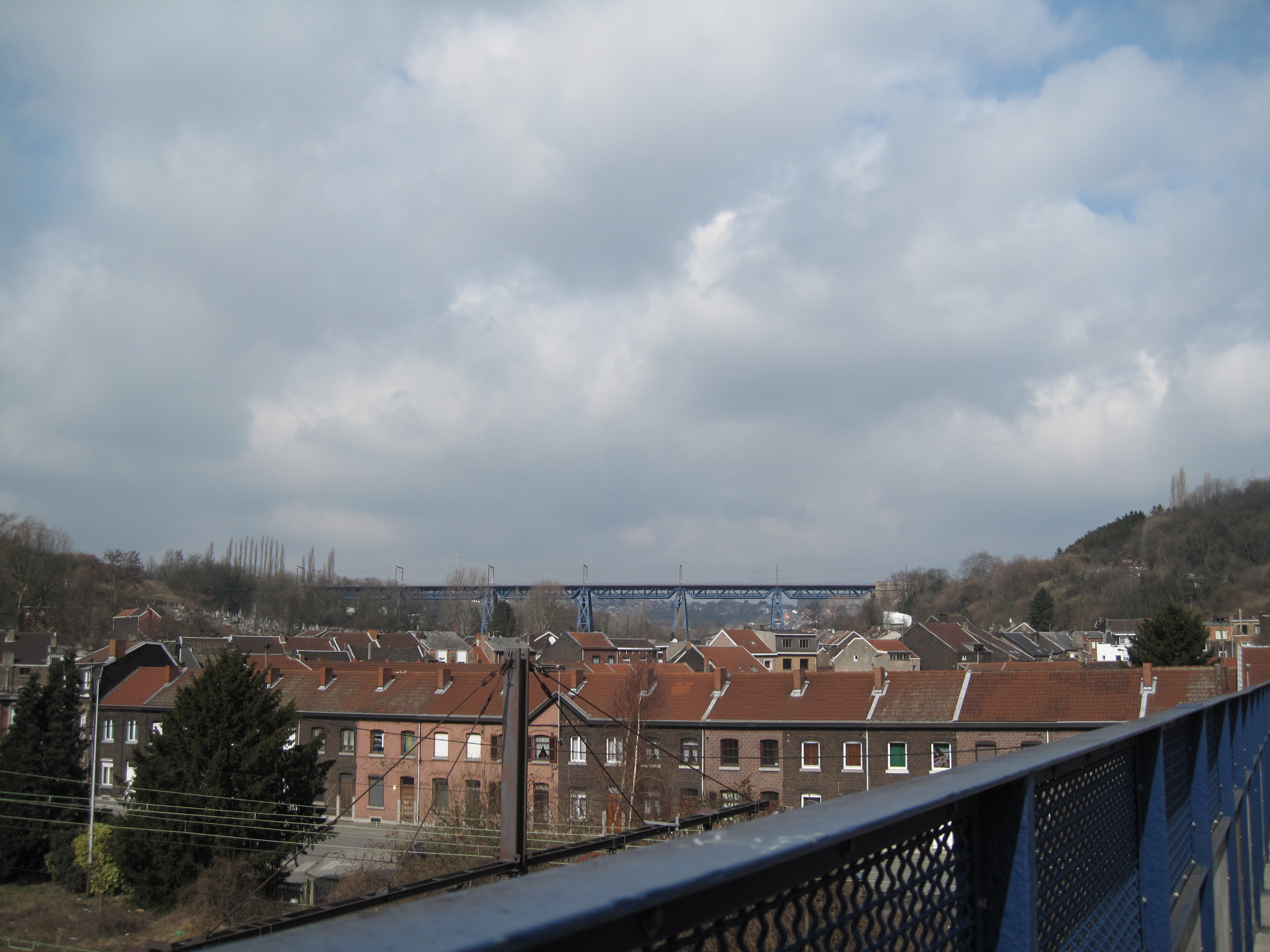
- Tilleur and the Horloz Bridge as seen from the railway footbridge.
- Interactive map of Tilleur
- Country: Belgium
- Region: Wallonia
- Province: Liège
- Municipality: Saint-Nicolas
- Postal code: 4420

Tilleur (French: [tilœʁ]; Walloon: Tileu) is a district (section) of the municipality of Saint-Nicolas, located in the Province of Liège, Wallonia, Belgium. Tilleur was formerly an independent municipality until the 1977 fusion of the Belgian municipalities, when it became part of Saint-Nicolas.

The name Tilleur is believed to derive from the Latin word teguletum, referring to a tile works or a place where roof tiles or pottery were manufactured or stored.
