= Saint-Nicolas, Liège =

Municipality in Liège Province, Wallonia, Belgium

Saint-Nicolas: Sint-Nicolai-dlé-Lidje (Walloon)
- Municipality
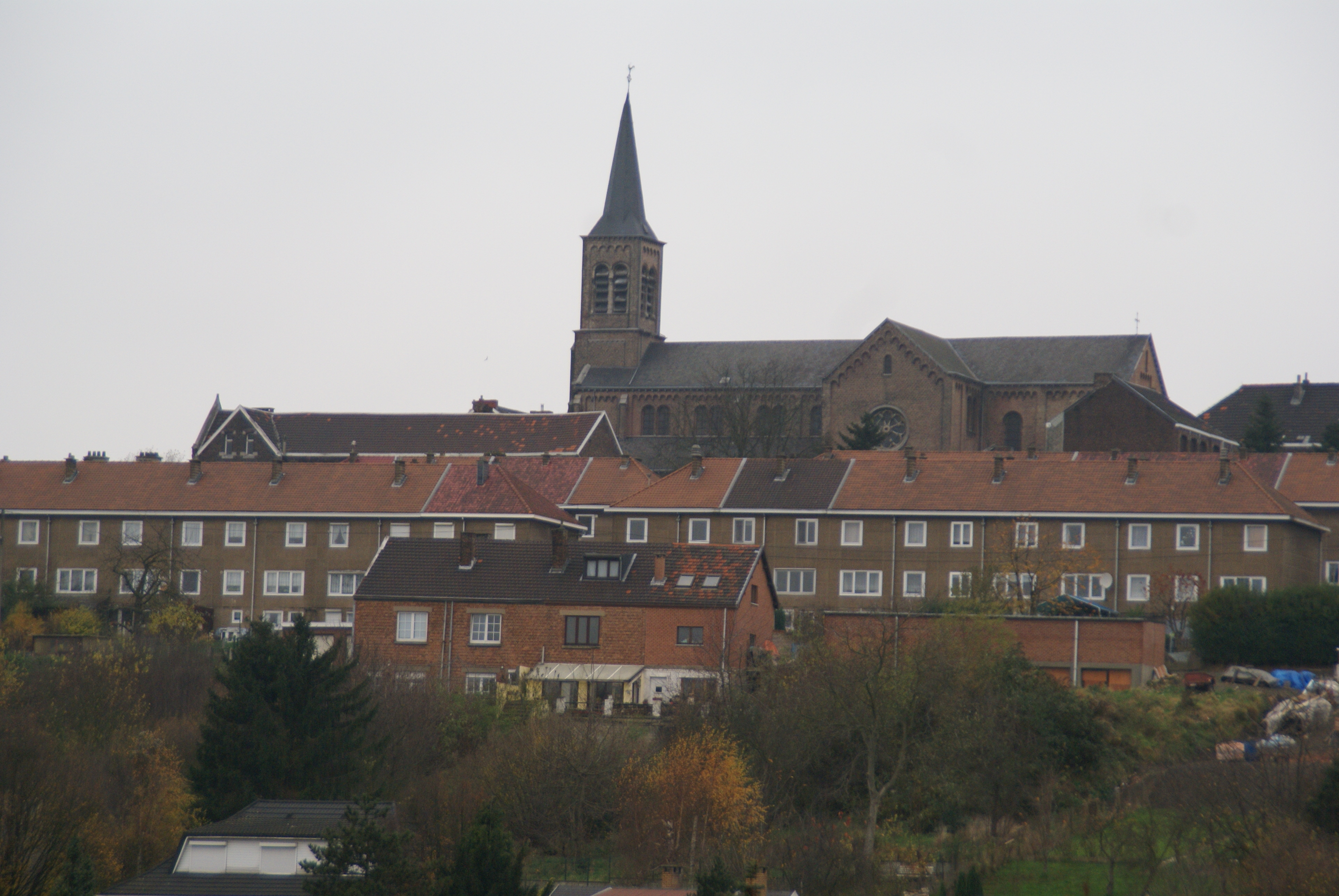

- Location of Saint-Nicolas in Liège province
- Interactive map of Saint-Nicolas
- Location in Belgium
- Coordinates: 50°38′N 05°32′E
- Country: Belgium
- Community: French Community
- Region: Wallonia
- Province: Liège
- Arrondissement: Liège

Government
  - Mayor: Valérie Maes
  - Governing party: PS

Area
  - Total: 6.91 km^{2} (2.67 sq mi)

Population (2018-01-01)
  - Total: 24,251
  - Density: 3,510/km^{2} (9,090/sq mi)
- Postal codes: 4420
- NIS code: 62093
- Area codes: 04
- Website: www.saint-nicolas.be

Saint-Nicolas (French pronunciation: [sɛ̃ nikɔla]; Walloon: Sint-Nicolai-dlé-Lidje) is a municipality of Wallonia located in the province of Liège, Belgium.

It is effectively a part of the greater Liège conurbation stretching west from Liège city centre towards Liège Airport. As of 1 January 2006 Saint-Nicolas had a total population of 22,666. The total area is 6.84 km^{2} which gives a population density of 3,313 inhabitants per km^{2}. It has the highest population density of any Belgian municipality outside the Brussels-Capital Region.

Since 1977 the municipality consists of the following districts: Montegnée, Saint-Nicolas, and Tilleur.

== Notable people ==
Well known natives include

- Sandra Kim, singer who won the Eurovision Song Contest 1986 held in Bergen, Norway, 1986
- Mario Barravecchia, singer
- Roberto Bisconti, football player
- Georges Theunis, Prime Minister of Belgium, 1921–25, 1934–35.

== See also ==
- List of protected heritage sites in Saint-Nicolas, Belgium
