= Jemeppe-sur-Meuse =

Coordinates: 50°36′58″N 5°30′13″E

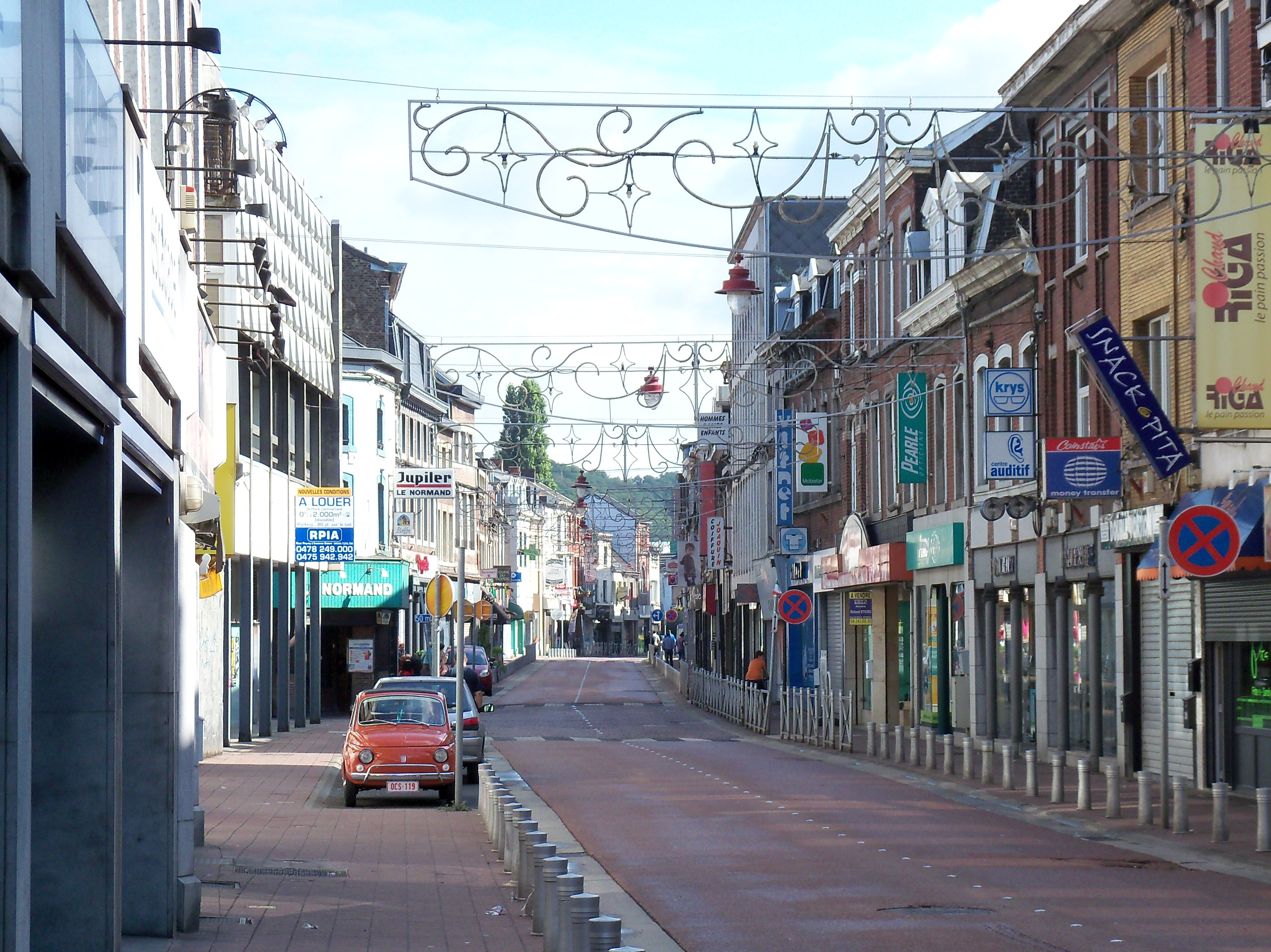
Jemeppe-sur-Meuse, Rue du pont

Jemeppe-sur-Meuse (French pronunciation: [ʒəmɛp syʁ møz], literally Jemeppe on Meuse; Walloon: Djimepe-so-Mouze) is a town of Wallonia and a district of the municipality of Seraing, located in the province of Liège, Belgium.

It was a separate municipality before the merging of municipalities in 1977. The inhabitants are about 10,000 and are called Jemeppians.

This town is best known for its steel industry, and before 1960, its coal mines. The old town has three castles: Ordange Castle, Antoine Castle and Courtejoie Castle. It is also the moral center of Antoinism.

== Notable people ==
Born in Jemeppe:

- Joseph Gindra (1862–1938), painter
- Jean Godeaux (1922–2009), banker
