= 42 cm Gamma howitzer =

German siege artillery

42cm Gamma-Gerät
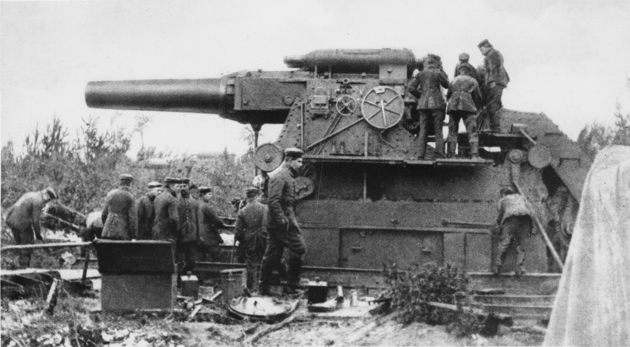
- A Gamma-Gerät in 1914
- Type: Siege artillery
- Place of origin: German Empire

Service history
- In service: 1909–1942
- Used by: German Empire; Nazi Germany
- Wars: World War I World War II

Production history
- Manufacturer: Krupp
- No. built: 10

Specifications
- Mass: 150 t (150 long tons)
- Length: 13.5 m (44 ft)
- Barrel length: 6.7 m (22 ft) L/16
- Height: 4.25 m (13.9 ft)
- Diameter: 420 mm (17 in)
- Elevation: +43° to 75°
- Maximum firing range: 14,200 m (46,600 ft)

The 42 cm kurze Marinekanone L/12, or Gamma-Gerät ("Gamma Device"), was a German siege gun built by Krupp. The Gamma-Gerät's barrel diameter was 42 cm (17 in), making it one of the largest artillery pieces ever fielded. The Gamma-Gerät began development in 1906 and entered service with the Imperial German Army in 1911. The Gamma-Gerät was the most powerful piece of artillery fielded by the Imperial German Army, but due to its extreme weight was mostly immobile and could only be emplaced near permanent rail lines. As a result, the Gamma-Gerät had limited effectiveness on the Western and Eastern Fronts of World War I.

A total of ten Gamma-Gerät howitzers were produced, mostly during World War I, and were assigned to a total of six artillery batteries, typically two guns to a battery. These batteries were deployed at various sieges and battles in Belgium, France, Poland, and Serbia. Allied counter-battery fire and internal detonations caused by faulty ammunition reduced the number of extant Gamma-Gerät howitzers to a single gun by the end of World War I. This Gamma-Gerät survived the aftermath of World War I and saw limited use in World War II by the Wehrmacht to attack the Maginot Line and besiege Sevastopol.

== Development ==
Beginning in the 1850s, advancements in artillery technology meant that modern artillery could fire from beyond the range of fortress guns. In response, military architects began placing forts in rings around cities or on a frontier to block approaching armies. New high explosive artillery shells with time-delay fuzes, which could penetrate earth to destroy masonry underground, made these forts themselves vulnerable to artillery. In response, the mid-19th century style of polygonal fort was abandoned in favour of forts built with concrete and mostly underground, with guns mounted in armoured, rotating casemates. Combining rings and fortified frontiers, France created a vast fortified zone on their border with Germany. Meanwhile, Belgium began construction of the National Redoubt in 1888.

The German Empire also fortified its borders, but Chief of the General Staff Helmuth von Moltke the Elder desired to break through Franco-Belgian fortifications. Although German artillery had been effective during the Franco-Prussian War, by the 1880s the diameter of the German Army's most powerful gun, 21 cm (8.3 in), had become the standard thickness for fortress concrete. Moltke began requesting more powerful guns that same decade, which his successor, Alfred von Schlieffen, saw as key to his plan to quickly defeat France by sweeping through Belgium. In 1893, the German Army's Artillerieprüfungskommission (Artillery Test Commission, APK) formed a secret partnership with Krupp to supervise development of a weapon that could break Franco-Belgian fortresses. Following a study that showed that a 30.5 cm (12.0 in) shell could penetrate modern fortresses, Krupp designed and built a 30.5 cm mortar, the Beta-Gerät. The Beta-Gerät was adopted into service in 1897 as the schwere Küstenmörser L/8, a cover name concealing its true purpose, (Note: Comparable large-scale mortars were termed Küstenmörser, "Coastal mortars," as they were used in coastal artillery batteries.) making it Germany's first large artillery piece to have a breech and a recoil system. Further studies conducted by the APK in the mid-1890s showed that the Beta-Gerät could not penetrate the armor of modern Franco-Belgian forts, even with revised shells. Interest in an improved siege gun waned until the Russo-Japanese War, during which the Japanese Army used coastal mortars brought from Japan to end the 11-month long siege of Port Arthur.

Helmuth von Moltke the Younger, Chief of the General Staff since 1 January 1906, sought a larger siege gun. In 1906, he instructed the APK to conduct further evaluation of the Beta-Gerät. The resulting study suggested a siege gun with a caliber as large as 45 cm (18 in), but the German Army opted for a 30.5 cm and a 42 cm gun. The former, the Beta-Gerät 09, had a greater range and accuracy than the Beta-Gerät, but was difficult to transport and could not penetrate fortress concrete. Only two were produced. Meanwhile, the 42 cm gun was designed in 1906 and its first model was delivered for testing in May 1909. After initial difficulties with penetration, the gun was accepted into the German Army in 1911 as the kurze Marinekanone L/12, or the Gamma-Gerät. The first in-service Gamma-Gerät was ordered in 1910, followed by another in 1911, three more in 1912, and an additional five during World War I. In total, ten were manufactured, along with 18 additional barrels. The power but near-immobility of the Gamma-Gerät inspired further development by the APK, who addressed mobility in the development of the M-Gerät "Big Bertha" howitzer by pulling it with tractors.

=== Design and production ===
The Gamma-Gerät was the largest and most powerful siege gun deployed by the Imperial German Army. Fully assembled, it stood 4.25 m (13.9 ft) high and 13.5 m (44 ft) long. It was breechloaded, making use of a horizontally-sliding breechblock, and at full charge fired a shell at 452 metres per second (1,480 ft/s) from a rifled, 6.7 m (22 ft) long barrel for a maximum range of 14,000–14,200 m (45,900–46,600 ft). The gun had a traverse of 46° and an elevation of 43° to 75°, adjusted with a hand-turned wheel on the front of the gun and another on the gun carriage for finetuning.

The gun weighed 150 metric tonnes, ensuring that it could only be emplaced near permanent railways in a process that took 24 hours. For transport, the Gamma-Gerät was disassembled and moved by rail in seven portions that weighed between 20 and 25 metric tonnes. (Note: According to Hogg, ten flatcars were used to move the Gamma-Gerät during World War II.) Emplacement required the clearing of all nearby vegetation and the digging of a rectangular 2.25 m (7.4 ft) pit and the spinning of a spur off the nearest permanent railway to the site. A 25-metric-tonne rail-mounted gantry crane would then be used to assemble all seven portions of the Gamma-Gerät. Its usual rate of fire was one shell every seven minutes and eight shells in an hour. The fastest recorded rates of fire were 19 shells an hour for a single Gamma-Gerät and 30 shells an hour for a two-gun battery.

"Gerät" siege artillery variants
Name	Calibre	Weight	Range	Rate of fire	Time to emplace (hours)
M-Gerät "Big Bertha"	42 cm (17 in)	42.6 t (41.9 long tons; 47.0 short tons)	9,300 m (10,200 yd)	8 shells an hour	5–6
Gamma-Gerät	42 cm (17 in)	150 t (150 long tons; 170 short tons)	14,000 m (15,000 yd)	8 shells an hour	24
Beta-M-Gerät	30.5 cm (12.0 in)	47 t (46 long tons; 52 short tons)	20,500 m (22,400 yd)	8 shells an hour	7–8
Beta-Gerät 09	30.5 cm (12.0 in)	45 t (44 long tons; 50 short tons)	12,000 m (13,000 yd)	12 shells an hour	12
Beta-Gerät	30.5 cm (12.0 in)	30 t (30 long tons; 33 short tons)	8,200 m (9,000 yd)	15 shells an hour	12

=== Ammunition ===
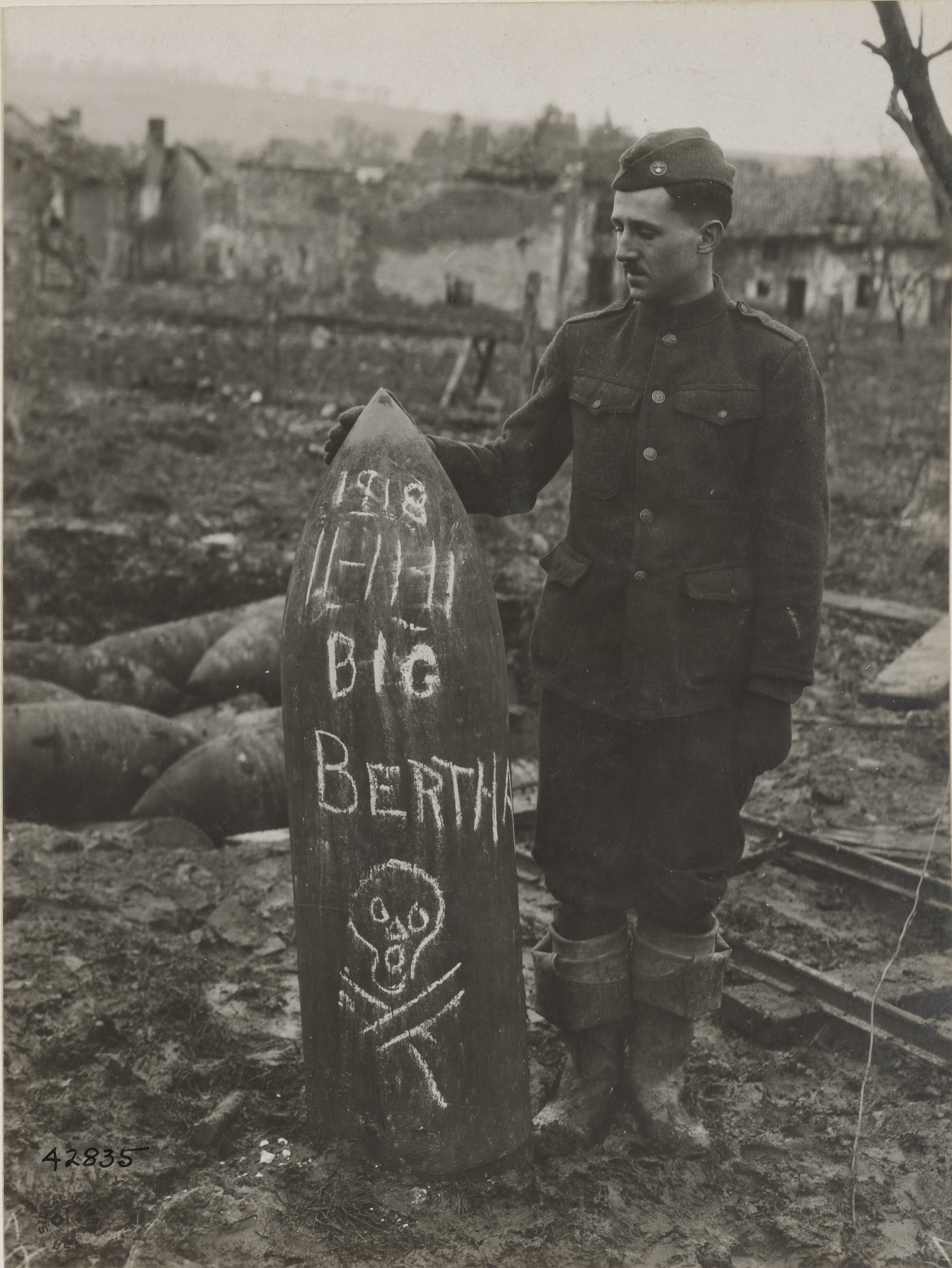
A 42cm projectile in 1918

German siege artillery had three types of projectiles: armour-piercing, high-explosive, and intermediate. The armour-piercing shell was designed to smash through concrete and metal armour, but was largely ineffective against reinforced concrete. High-explosive shells were fitted with two charges and could be set to have no delay, a short delay, or a long delay. If set to "no delay," then the shell burst on impact. If set to a delayed detonation, it could penetrate up to 12 m (39 ft) of earth. Finally, the intermediate, or "short shell," weighed half as much as the high-explosive shell and was fitted with a ballistic tip for range and accuracy. Shells for the 42 cm guns were generally 1.5 m (4.9 ft) long, weighed between 400 and 1,160 kg (880 and 2,560 lb), and were propelled via primer loaded into the gun with a brass casing. Siege artillery shells were produced in limited runs of varying quality. Beginning in early 1916, German siege guns began to suffer internal explosions due to faulty ammunition. As a result, crews were required to disembark from the gun before firing via a lanyard.

== Service history ==
The kurze Marinekanone (KMK) batteries that formed with Gamma-Gerät guns were 1 (2 August 1914), 2 (2 August 1914), and 4 (October 1914). In April 1916, Batteries 1 and 2 were split to form additional batteries: 8, 9, and 11. When Battery 8 had its guns destroyed by internal explosion in 1917, it was outfitted with two Beta-M-Gerät mortars, converted from the destroyed Gamma-Gerät guns.

=== World War I ===
With the start of World War I, all siege gun batteries were mobilised and assigned to the Western Front. KMK Battery 2 was sent north to Namur, but could not arrive in time to participate in the Siege of Namur, while KMK Battery 1 was assigned to the 6th Army in Lorraine. As part of the 6th Army, it participated in the siege of the Fort de Manonviller from 25–27 August 1914. During the 52-hour siege the battery had technical troubles and had to stop firing. KMK Battery 1 finally arrived at the then-ongoing siege of Maubeuge in early September and joined the siege guns already present in obliterating Forts Leveau, Héronfontaine, Cerfontaine, and Sarts. On 7 September 1914, Maubeuge's remaining garrisons surrendered.

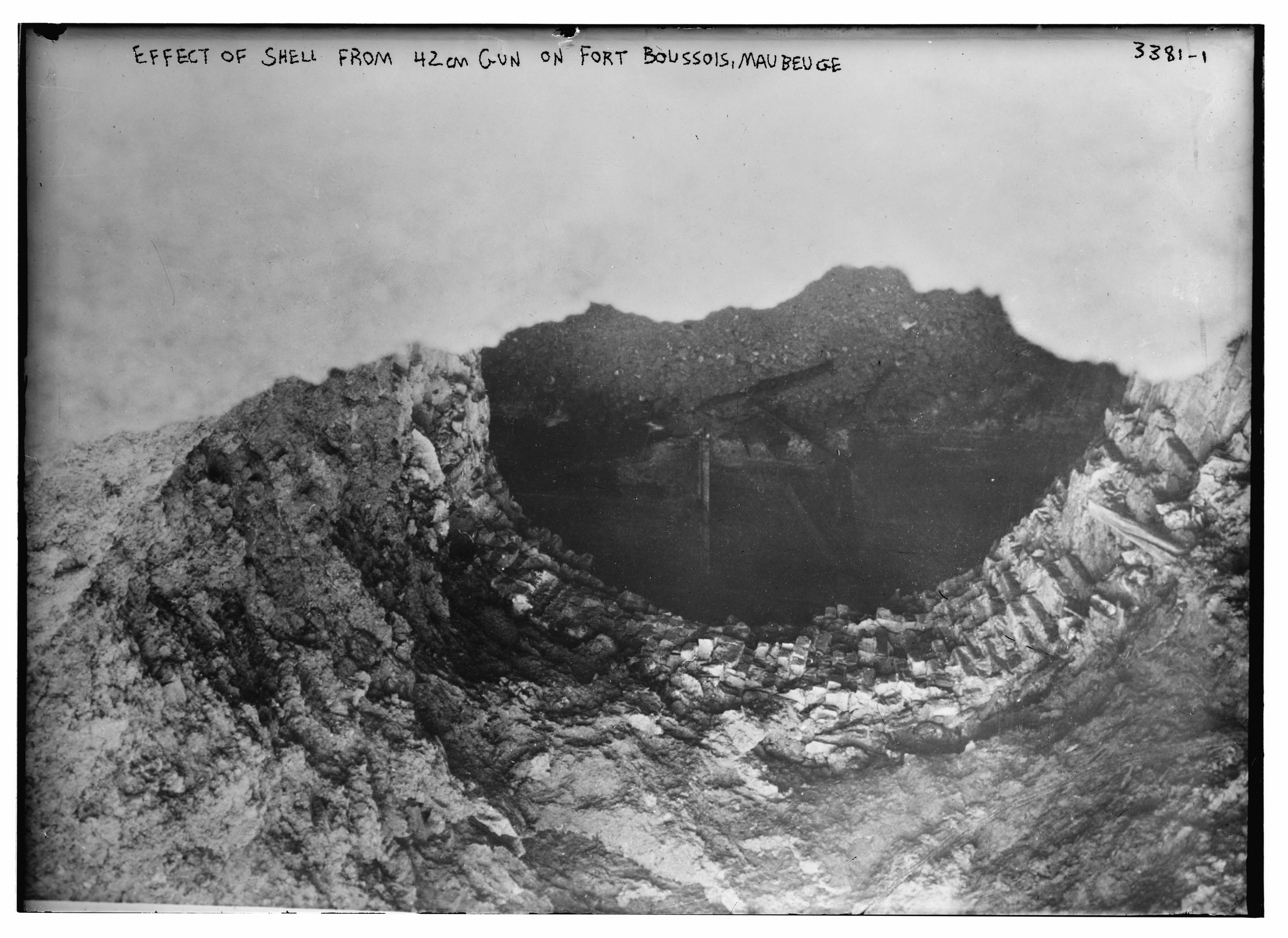
42cm shell crater at the Fort de Boussois

The German defeat at the First Battle of the Marne prevented the siege guns at Maubeuge from being sent against Paris, so they were sent back into Belgium to Antwerp. The Belgian Army, which had retreated to the city on 20 August following the fall of Liège, had made attacks on the German flank on 24–25 August and 9 September. In response, the III Reserve Corps, from the 1st Army, was sent to capture the city. The Corps arrived at Antwerp on 27 September, partially surrounding it and massing at its southern side. The next day, KMK Battery 2 opened bombardment against the Fort de Wavre-Sainte-Catherine, which was destroyed on 29 September by a magazine detonation caused by a 42 cm shell. KMK Battery 2 then shifted its fire to the Fort de Koningshooikt, which surrendered on 2 October. Beginning on 7 October and lasting the next two days, Antwerp's defenders began withdrawing from the city, which then surrendered on 10 October. With the fall of Antwerp, KMK Battery 2 was attached to the 4th Army to aid in its capture of the Channel ports, and occasionally shelled Nieuport, Ypres, and Diksmuide.

On 27 February 1915, KMK Battery 1 arrived on the Eastern Front with the 8th Army and joined the ongoing attack on Osowiec Fortress. Although the fortress was made of masonry, it survived because the artillery had no spotters to guide its fire and because of effective counter-battery fire from the fortress. After five days, the siege guns were withdrawn and the fort was besieged until August. On 8 August, KMK Batteries 1 and 4 fired on Kaunas Fortress to support the XXXX Reserve Corps. While slow, the bombardment was highly effective because of outdated masonry construction, and the Germans took four forts altogether on 16–17 August. The Russians evacuated from the city and fortress the next day. The last deployment of Gamma-Gerät guns in the East was the German invasion of Serbia. On 6 October 1915, KMK Batteries 1 and 4 opened fire on Serbian fortifications east of Belgrade to support the crossing of the 11th Army, made the next day. Battery 1 briefly fired on Smederevo Fortress, but the fortress was undamaged when it surrendered on 11 October.

KMK Batteries 1 and 4 were transferred back to the Western Front in early 1916 and were assigned to the 5th Army for the upcoming Battle of Verdun. The battle began on 21 February with an intense, nine-hour artillery barrage. The 42 cm guns were tasked with bombarding Forts Douaumont, Vaux, Souville, and Moulainville, the most modern fortresses at Verdun, to silence their guns and prevent French units from rallying at them. However, despite heavy shelling by all thirteen 42 cm guns, the forts were only lightly damaged. At the same time, French counter-battery artillery and internal explosions plagued German siege guns; KMK Batteries 2 and 8 lost a Gamma-Gerät each while KMK Battery 9 lost its only Gamma-Gerät. In July, siege batteries began to be withdrawn north to the Battle of the Somme, and east to Romania. KMK Battery 4 remained at Verdun, while Battery 1 attacked Arras and Loos-en-Gohelle in June and July.

In the last two years of the war, siege guns saw limited use and negligible effect on the Western and Eastern fronts. In 1917, KMK Battery 8 was denuded of its Gamma-Gerät guns by internal explosion and Allied counter-battery fire and was reequipped with an ineffective war-time iteration of the M-Gerät. Ahead of the final German offensive of the war, KMK Battery 4 was assigned to the 17th Army on the Somme. It was moved to join the 1st Army at Reims in July 1918. By the end of the year, the battery was one of five remaining siege gun batteries in the German Army and wielded a single Gamma-Gerät.

=== World War II ===
Three German siege guns survived to the end of World War I. Two were surrendered to the United States and the third, the final Gamma-Gerät, was disassembled and hidden from Allied inspectors in Krupp's Meppen facilities. In 1937, at the request of the new German Army, the gun was reassembled for use in the development of concrete-penetrating shells. When World War II began, this surviving Gamma-Gerät was put back into military service. In 1940, it was used to bombard the fortresses of Liège and the Fortified Sector of the Sarre, a portion of the Maginot Line. The Gamma-Gerät was placed in storage after the fall of France until early 1942, when it was sent to bomb the fortresses of Sevastopol, which it shelled from February until exhausting its munitions on 13 June. It was also deployed at Kronstadt in 1942, but did not fire a single shot there. Production of 42 cm shells was resumed to supply the Gamma-Gerät and continued to as late as July 1944.In 1944, the Gamma-Gerät was removed from active service and returned to Germany. Its post-war fate is unknown.

== See also ==
- Big Bertha (howitzer)
- List of the largest cannon by caliber
