= Ouvrage La Salmagne =

Petit ouvrage of the Maginot line

- Part of Maginot Line New Fronts, Séré de Rivières system
- Northern France
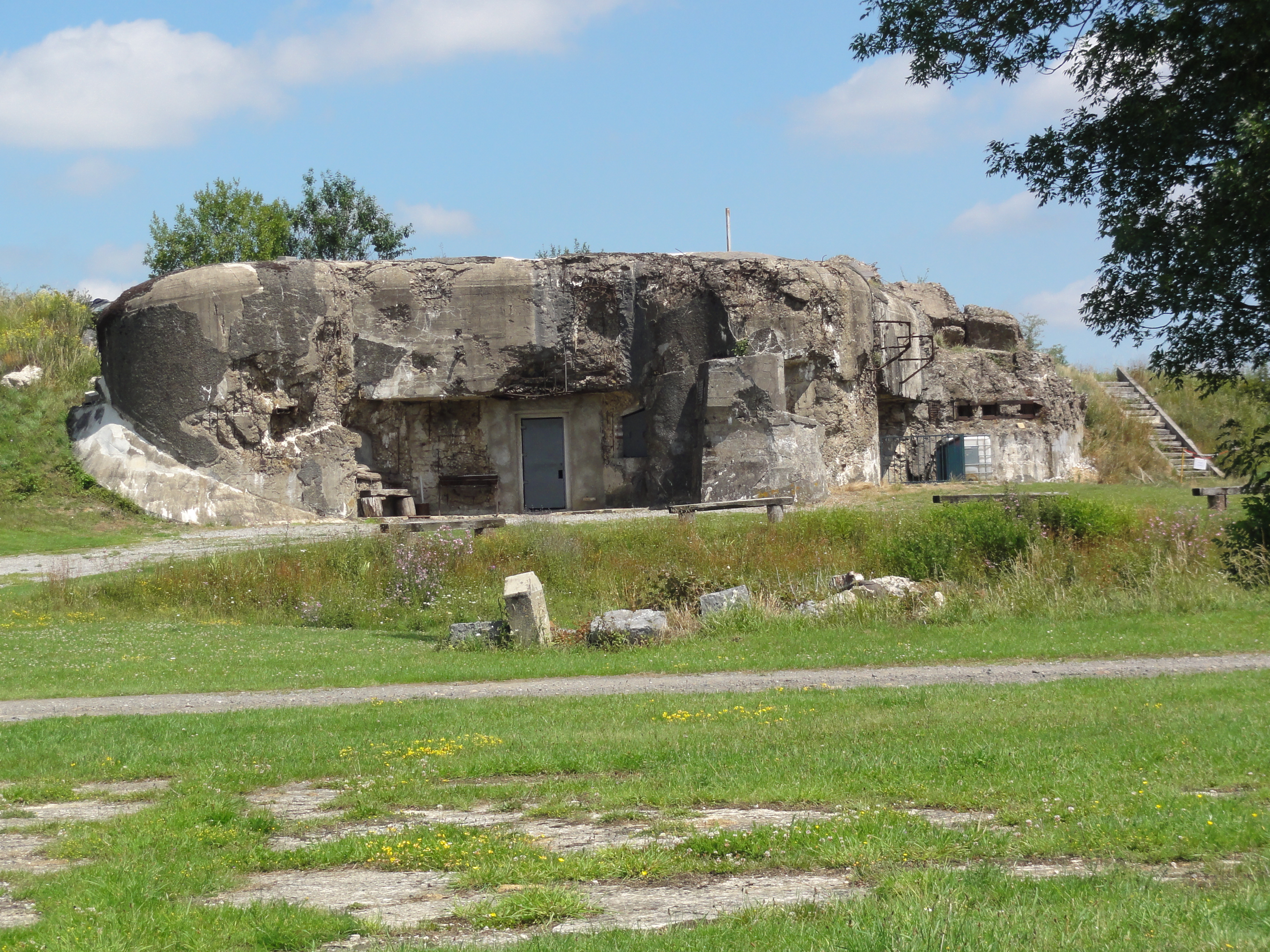
- Ouvrage La Salmagne

Site information
- Controlled by: France
- Open to the public: Yes
- Condition: Preserved

Location
- Coordinates: 50.32253°N 4.01881°E

Site history
- Built: 1934-1938
- Materials: Concrete, steel, deep excavation, masonry
- Battles/wars: Siege of Maubeuge, Battle of France

Ouvrage La Salmagne is a petit ouvrage of the Maginot Line, built as part of the "New Fronts" program to address shortcomings in the Line's coverage of the border with Belgium. Like the other three ouvrages near Maubeuge, it is built on an old Séré de Rivières system fortification, near the town of Bersillies. The Ouvrage Bersillies is nearby to the northwest. La Salmagne has been preserved and is open to the public.

== Séré de Rivières ==
The original Ouvrage de la Salmagne was built to the northeast of Bersillies in 1884-1895 as part of the Séré de Rivières fortifications of Maubeuge. The trapezoidal fort is surrounded by a ditch defended by counterscarps. It was armed with six 120mm guns, four 95mm guns and several smaller pieces. La Salmagne was attacked by German forces in 1914 during the Siege of Maubeuge. It surrendered to the Germans on 5 September 1914.

== Design and construction ==
The Maginot-era site was approved in 1934. Work cost 6.2 million francs.

== Description ==
La Salmagne comprises two combat blocks. The ouvrage (Note: English-language sources use the French term ouvrage as the preferred term for the Maginot positions, in preference to "fort", a term usually reserved for older fortifications with passive defenses in the form of walls and ditches, although in this case ouvrage also applies to a lesser fortification with a small garrison. The literal translation of ouvrage in the sense of a fortification in English is "work." A Maginot gros ouvrage is a large fortification with a significant artillery component, while a petit ouvrage is smaller, with lighter arms.) was built within the walls of the old Ouvrage de la Salmagne. An underground gallery connects the two blocks, with underground service and barracks spaces under Block 1.

- Block 1: infantry block with one automatic rifle cloche (GFM-B), one mixed-arms cloche (AM) and one retractable mixed-arms turret.
- Block 2: infantry/entrance block with two GFM cloches, one grenade launcher cloche (LG), one automatic rifle embrasure and one machine gun/47mm anti-tank gun (JM/AC47) embrasure.

== Manning ==
The 1940 manning of the ouvrage under the command of Captain Brichard comprised 97 men and 3 officers of the 84th Fortress Infantry Regiment. The units were under the umbrella of the 101st Fortress Infantry Division, 1st Army, Army Group 1.

== History of the Maginot ouvrage ==
See Fortified Sector of Maubeuge for a broader discussion of the events of 1940 in the Maubeuge sector of the Maginot Line.

During the Battle of France in 1940, the invading German forces approached Maubeuge from the south and east, to the rear of the defensive line. The German 28th Infantry Division moved along the line of fortifications 19–22 May, rolling up blockhouses and larger fortifications. La Salmagne was hit with aerial and artillery bombardments. After the fall of Ouvrage Boussois on 22 May the Germans concentrated on La Salmagne, which had been supporting its neighbor. 15 cm gunfire was concentrated on Block 2, which was evacuated at 1500. After the AM cloche on Block 1 was destroyed by explosives the position lost all means of resistance. Facing asphyxiation from smoke and fumes, La Salmagne's garrison surrendered at 2030. During the ensuing years of World War II, Salmagne was stripped of salvageable metals by the Germans.

== Current condition ==
La Salmagne is managed by the Association des Amis de la Forteresse du Secteur Fortifié de Maubeuge. The fort is open to the public on weekends during the summer months.

== See also ==
- List of all works on Maginot Line
- Siegfried Line
- Atlantic Wall
- Czechoslovak border fortifications

== Bibliography ==
- Allcorn, William. The Maginot Line 1928-45. Oxford: Osprey Publishing, 2003. ISBN 1-84176-646-1
- Degon, André; Zylberyng, Didier, La Ligne Maginot: Guide des Forts à Visiter, Editions Ouest-France, 2014. ISBN 978-2-7373-6080-0 (in French)
- Kaufmann, J.E. and Kaufmann, H.W. Fortress France: The Maginot Line and French Defenses in World War II, Stackpole Books, 2006. ISBN 0-275-98345-5
- Kaufmann, J.E., Kaufmann, H.W., Jancovič-Potočnik, A. and Lang, P. The Maginot Line: History and Guide, Pen and Sword, 2011. ISBN 978-1-84884-068-3
- Mary, Jean-Yves; Hohnadel, Alain; Sicard, Jacques. Hommes et Ouvrages de la Ligne Maginot, Tome 1. Paris, Histoire & Collections, 2001. ISBN 2-908182-88-2 (in French)
- Mary, Jean-Yves; Hohnadel, Alain; Sicard, Jacques. Hommes et Ouvrages de la Ligne Maginot, Tome 2. Paris, Histoire & Collections, 2003. ISBN 2-908182-97-1 (in French)
- Mary, Jean-Yves; Hohnadel, Alain; Sicard, Jacques. Hommes et Ouvrages de la Ligne Maginot, Tome 3. Paris, Histoire & Collections, 2003. ISBN 2-913903-88-6 (in French)
- Mary, Jean-Yves; Hohnadel, Alain; Sicard, Jacques. Hommes et Ouvrages de la Ligne Maginot, Tome 5. Paris, Histoire & Collections, 2009. ISBN 978-2-35250-127-5 (in French)
