= Ouvrage Bersillies =

- Part of Maginot Line New Fronts, Séré de Rivières system
- Northern France

Site information
- Controlled by: France

Location
- Coordinates: 50.32708°N 4.00644°E

Site history
- Built: 1934-1938
- Materials: Concrete, steel, deep excavation, masonry
- Battles/wars: Siege of Maubeuge, Battle of France

Ouvrage Bersillies is a petit ouvrage of the Maginot Line, built as part of the "New Fronts" program to address shortcomings in the Line's coverage of the border with Belgium. Like the other three ouvrages near Maubeuge, it is built on an old Séré de Rivières-system fortification, near the town of Bersillies. The preserved Ouvrage La Salmagne is nearby to the southeast. Bersillies is not open to the public.

== Séré de Rivières ==
The original Ouvrage de Bersillies was built to the north of Bersillies in 1884–1895 as part of the Séré de Rivières fortifications of Maubeuge. The trapezoidal fort is surrounded by a ditch defended by counterscarps. It was armed with four 95 mm guns and several smaller pieces. The small infantry shelters or abris housed the troops. The position was planned to cover the D228 road. Bersillies was attacked by German forces in 1914 during the Siege of Maubeuge. Isolated far behind the front lines, it surrendered to the Germans with the other Maubeuge fortifications in early September 1914.

== Design and construction ==
The Maginot-era site was approved in 1934. Work cost 6.04 million francs.

== Description ==
The Maginot-era improvements to Bersillies comprise two combat blocks. The ouvrage (Note: English-language sources use the French term ouvrage as the preferred term for the Maginot positions, in preference to "fort", a term usually reserved for older fortifications with passive defenses in the form of walls and ditches, although in this case ouvrage also applies to a lesser fortification with a small garrison. The literal translation of ouvrage in the sense of a fortification in English is "work." A Maginot gros ouvrage is a large fortification with a significant artillery component, while a petit ouvrage is smaller, with lighter arms.) was built within the walls of the old Ouvrage de Bersillies. An underground gallery connects the two blocks, with underground service and barracks spaces along the short gallery.

- Block 1: infantry/entry block with one automatic rifle cloche (GFM-B), one mixed-arms cloche (AM), one grenade launcher cloche (LG), one automatic rifle embrasure and one and one machine gun/47mm anti-tank gun (JM/AC47) embrasure.
- Block 2: infantry/entrance block with two GFM cloches, two AM cloches and two retractable twin machine gun turrets.

A number of small blockhouses are associated with Bersillies, as well as a casemate:

- Casemate de Crèvecoeur: Double block with two JM/AC47 embrasures, two JM embrasures, one AM cloche and two GFM-B cloches. It is not connected to the ouvrage.

== Manning ==
The 1940 manning of the ouvrage under the command of Captain Pujade comprised 97 men and 3 officers of the 84th Fortress Infantry Regiment. The units were under the umbrella of the 101st Fortress Infantry Division, 1st Army, Army Group 1.

== History of the Maginot ouvrage ==
See Fortified Sector of Maubeuge for a broader discussion of the events of 1940 in the Maubeuge sector of the Maginot Line.

During the Battle of France in 1940, the invading German forces approached Maubeuge from the south and east, to the rear of the defensive line. The German 28th Infantry Division moved along the line of fortifications 19–22 May, rolling up blockhouses and larger fortifications. Bersillies was under attack on the morning of 22 May. Heavy close-range artillery fire on 23 May destroyed cloches and air intakes. With German troops on top of the ouvrage, Captain Pujade ceased firing and surrendered his garrison.

== Current condition ==
Bersillies is owned by a hunting society. It is secured, but is not open for sightseeing. It features an unusual number of murals painted by its garrison, which remain in a good state of preservation.

== See also ==
- List of all works on Maginot Line
- Siegfried Line
- Atlantic Wall
- Czechoslovak border fortifications

== Bibliography ==
- Allcorn, William. The Maginot Line 1928-45. Oxford: Osprey Publishing, 2003. ISBN 1-84176-646-1
- Kaufmann, J.E. and Kaufmann, H.W. Fortress France: The Maginot Line and French Defenses in World War II, Stackpole Books, 2006. ISBN 0-275-98345-5
- Kaufmann, J.E., Kaufmann, H.W., Jancovič-Potočnik, A. and Lang, P. The Maginot Line: History and Guide, Pen and Sword, 2011. ISBN 978-1-84884-068-3
- Mary, Jean-Yves; Hohnadel, Alain; Sicard, Jacques. Hommes et Ouvrages de la Ligne Maginot, Tome 1. Paris, Histoire & Collections, 2001. ISBN 2-908182-88-2 (in French)
- Mary, Jean-Yves; Hohnadel, Alain; Sicard, Jacques. Hommes et Ouvrages de la Ligne Maginot, Tome 2. Paris, Histoire & Collections, 2003. ISBN 2-908182-97-1 (in French)
- Mary, Jean-Yves; Hohnadel, Alain; Sicard, Jacques. Hommes et Ouvrages de la Ligne Maginot, Tome 3. Paris, Histoire & Collections, 2003. ISBN 2-913903-88-6 (in French)
- Mary, Jean-Yves; Hohnadel, Alain; Sicard, Jacques. Hommes et Ouvrages de la Ligne Maginot, Tome 5. Paris, Histoire & Collections, 2009. ISBN 978-2-35250-127-5 (in French)
