= Big Bertha (howitzer) =

Exceptionally large German siege artillery piece of World War I

42 centimetre M-Gerät "Big Bertha"
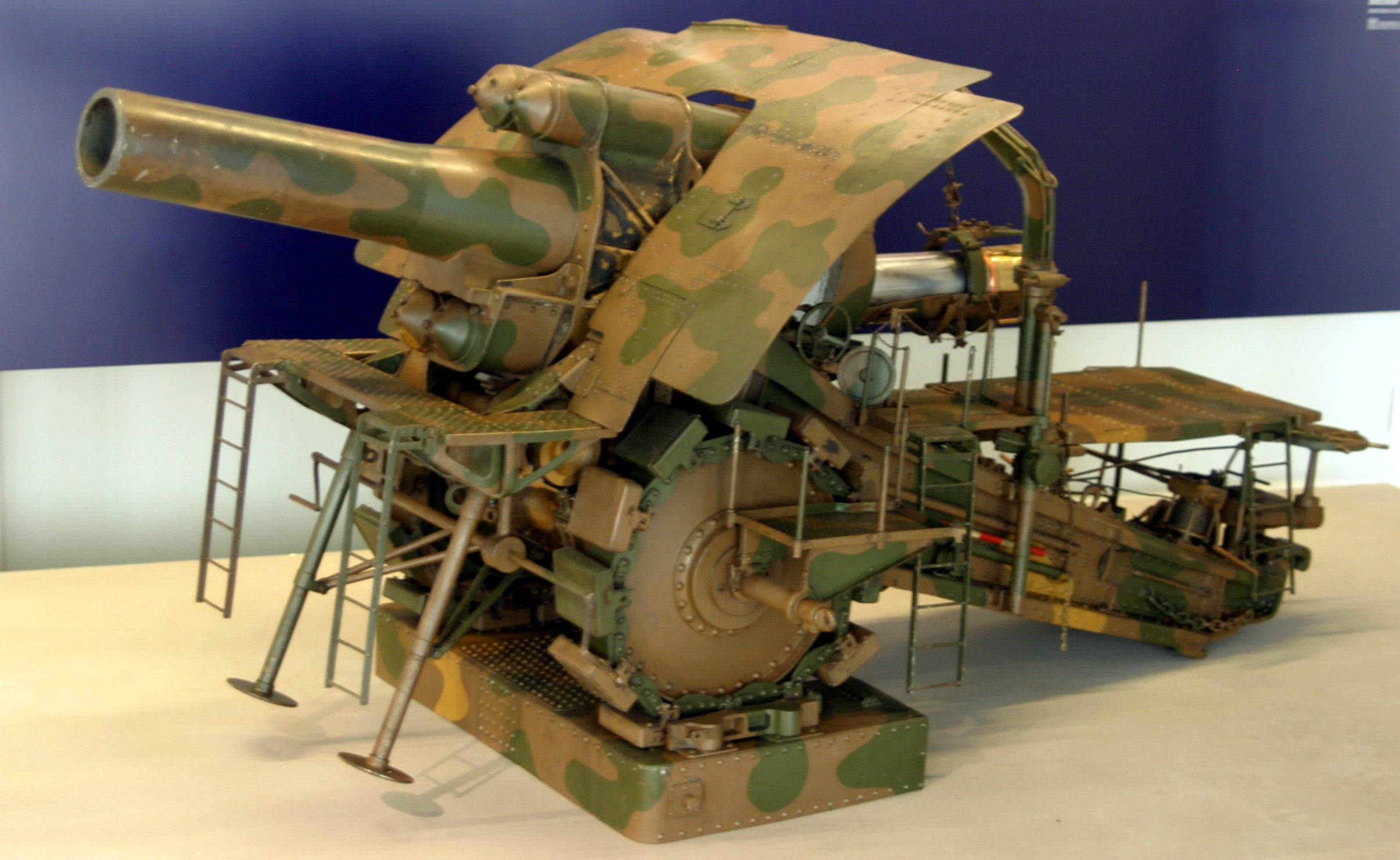
- Model of an M-Gerät at the Musée de l'Armée in Paris
- Type: Siege artillery
- Place of origin: German Empire

Service history
- In service: 1914–1918
- Used by: Imperial German Army
- Wars: World War I

Production history
- Manufacturer: Krupp
- Variants: 30.5 centimetre Beta-M-Gerät

Specifications
- Mass: 42,600 kg (93,900 lb)
- Length: 10 m (33 ft)
- Barrel length: 5.04 m (16 ft 6 in) L/12
- Width: 4.7 m (15 ft)
- Height: 4.5 m (15 ft)
- Diameter: 42 cm (17 in)
- Caliber: 420 mm (17 in)
- Elevation: +65°
- Traverse: 360°
- Rate of fire: 8 shells an hour or 1 shell per 7.5 minutes
- Muzzle velocity: 400 m/s (1,300 ft/s)
- Maximum firing range: 9,300 m (30,500 ft)

The 42 centimeter kurze Marinekanone 14 L/12 (short naval cannon), or Minenwerfer-Gerät (M-Gerät), popularly known by the name of Big Bertha, was a German siege howitzer built by Krupp AG in Essen, Germany and fielded by the Imperial German Army from 1914 to 1918. The M-Gerät had a 42 cm (17 in) calibre barrel, making it one of the largest artillery pieces ever fielded.

The M-Gerät designed in 1911 as an iteration of earlier super-heavy German siege guns intended to break modern fortresses in France and Belgium and entered production in 1912. Test firing began in early 1914 and the gun was estimated to be finished by October 1914. When the First World War broke out, the two M-Gerät guns, still prototypes, were sent to Liège, Belgium, and destroyed Forts Pontisse and Loncin. German soldiers bestowed the gun with the nickname "Big Bertha", which then spread through German newspapers to the Allies, who used it as a nickname for all super-heavy German artillery. The Paris Gun, a railway gun used to bomb Paris in 1918, has historically been confused for the M-Gerät.

Due to losses from faulty ammunition and Allied counter-battery artillery, a smaller-calibre (30.5 cm (12.0 in)) gun called the Beta-M-Gerät was built and fielded from 1916 until the end of the war. It had a longer and heavier barrel that was mated to the M-Gerät's carriage but was found to be less effective than the base gun.

== Development and design ==
The quick advancement of artillery technology beginning in the 1850s provoked an arms race between artillery and military architecture. Rifled artillery could now fire out of range of fortress guns, so military architects began placing forts in rings around cities or in barriers to block approaching armies. These forts were vulnerable to new artillery shells, which could penetrate earth to destroy masonry underground. In response, star forts evolved into polygonal forts, mostly underground and made of concrete with guns mounted in armoured, rotating casemates. Combining rings and barriers, France created a vast fortified zone on its border with Germany, while Belgium began construction of the National Redoubt in 1888.

The German Empire also fortified its borders, but Chief of the General Staff Helmuth von Moltke the Elder desired the ability to break through Franco-Belgian fortifications. Although German artillery had been effective during the Franco-Prussian War, it had been allowed to stagnate. By the 1880s the barrel diameter of the German Army's most powerful gun, the 21 cm (8.3 in) field howitzer, was no longer adequate against fortresses. Moltke began requesting more powerful guns that same decade. More powerful artillery became essential to his successor, Alfred von Schlieffen, who planned quickly to defeat France by sweeping through Belgium (the Schlieffen Plan) in response to the 1893 Franco-Russian Alliance. To be able to reduce French and Belgian fortresses, the Artillerieprüfungskommission (Artillery Test Commission, APK) formed a partnership with Krupp AG in 1893. The first result of this partnership was a 30.5 cm (12.0 in) mortar, accepted into service four years later as the schwerer Küstenmörser L/8, but known as the Beta-Gerät (Beta Apparatus) to disguise its purpose as a siege gun. (Note: Küstenmörser (coastal mortar), refers to large-calibre mortars designed to be used in coastal batteries against ironclad warships. By the 1890s, the use of mortars against ships had fallen out of favour, as hitting ships with a mortar was very difficult. Krupp had built and exhibited a 35.5 cm (14.0 in) mortar at the Centennial Exposition in 1876. A year later, The New York Times reported about a Krupp-built coastal defence gun with a diameter of 45 cm (18 in).) Tests in the mid-1890s showed that the Beta-Gerät could not destroy French or Belgian forts, even with improved shells. Interest in a more powerful siege gun waned until the Russo-Japanese War, during which the Japanese Army used 28 cm howitzer L/10 (28 cm (11 in) coastal guns) brought from Japan to end the 11-month long Siege of Port Arthur.

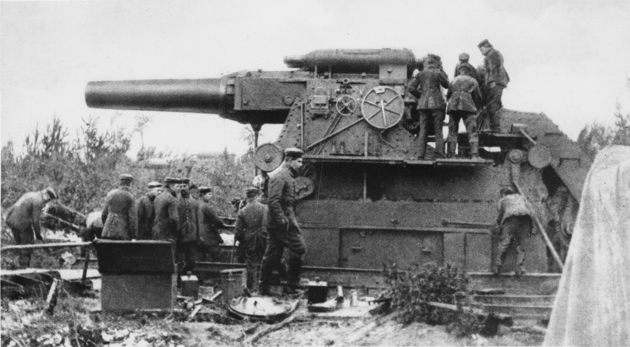
The Gamma-Gerät, predecessor of the M-Gerät

In 1906, Helmuth von Moltke the Younger became Chief of the General Staff and instructed the APK to study and improve the performance of the Beta-Gerät. The APK recommended a more powerful gun, with a diameter as large as 45 centimetres (18 in), but the German Army opted for a 30.5-centimetre howitzer, the Beta-Gerät 09 and a 42 cm (17 in) gun. Design and testing for the Gamma-Gerät began in 1906 and lasted until 1911. Although the Gamma-Gerät had the destructive power the General Staff required and could outrange French and Belgian fort guns, it could only be emplaced near rail lines and took 24 hours to prepare. (Note: 12 hours were required to prepare the base of the Gamma-Gerät and another 12 were needed to assemble the gun. Rail lines also had to be laid to the Gamma-Gerät's position to allow its assembly.) As early as 1907, Krupp began development of siege artillery transported by gun carriage. Testing resulted in a 28 cm (11 in) howitzer transportable over road and countryside but it was rejected by the APK, as was Krupp's 30.5-centimetre model. Finally, in late 1911, Krupp and the APK developed a wheeled 42-centimetre howitzer, the 42-centimetre kurze Marinekanone 14 L/12 or Minenwerfer-Gerät (M-Gerät). The APK ordered its first M-Gerät in July 1912 and another in February 1913. Tests of the gun's mobility began in December 1913 and found that gas-powered tractors were best for pulling it. Test firing, at one point observed by Kaiser Wilhelm II, began in February 1914, and Krupp estimated that the M-Gerät would be complete by October 1914.

=== Design and production ===
Assembled and emplaced, the M-Gerät weighed 42.6 t (47.0 tons), was 4.5 m (15 ft) tall, 10 m (33 ft) long and 4.7 m (15 ft) wide, and sat on a steel base with a spade for bracing. This spade could be lifted out of the ground while the M-Gerät was emplaced to move it, giving it a traverse of 360°. The gun was breech loaded, using a horizontally-sliding breech block and had a 5.04 m (16.5 ft) barrel that could be elevated to a maximum of 65°. The M-Gerät had a muzzle velocity of about 815 m/s (2,670 ft/s) and a maximum range of 9,300 m (30,500 ft). Post-prototype M-Gerät guns had a crew platform in front of the blast shield, a detachable breech, and solid wheels. The APK ordered the first M-Gerät in July 1912, delivered the following December, and a second in February 1913. Another two guns were ordered before the First World War on 31 July 1914, and then two more on 28 August and another pair on 11 November. Krupp eventually built 12 M-Gerät howitzers.

The M-Gerät had to be assembled for firing and for transport was dismantled and towed in five wagons. These wagons, weighing 16 to 20 t (16 to 20 long tons; 18 to 22 short tons) each, were designed to hold a specific portion of the M-Gerät, sans the gun carriage, which was its own wagon. These were towed by purpose-built, gas-powered tractors as the wagons were too heavy to be pulled by horses. To move across open country, the wagon wheels were fitted with articulated feet called radgürteln to reduce their ground pressure. Under optimal circumstances, the tractors and wagons could move at 7 km/h (4.3 mph).

The 30.5-centimetre Beta-M-Gerät, called the schwere Kartaune L/30, was developed in late 1917 to replace M-Gerät guns that had been rendered inoperable by premature detonation of shells. To increase the range of the M-Gerät and lower the likelihood of premature detonation, the APK selected a 9 m (30 ft)-long, 16 t (16 long tons; 18 short tons) naval barrel to be mounted onto the chassis of the M-Gerät. Two large spring cylinders were added to the front of the gun to counterbalance the new barrel, which had to be carried in a new carriage weighing 22 t (22 long tons; 24 short tons). Fully assembled, the Beta-M-Gerät weighed 47 t (46 long tons; 52 short tons) and had a maximum range of 20,500 m (67,300 ft). The propellant used to achieve that range caused three of the four Beta-M-Gerät guns to explode, forcing their crews to limit its range by 4,000 m (13,000 ft), defeating the purpose of the longer L/30 barrel. Only four Beta-M-Gerät guns were modified from two M-Gerät guns and two Gamma-Gerät guns (a one- to two-month-long process per gun), but 12 L/30 barrels were built.

"Gerät" siege artillery variants
Name	Calibre	Weight	Range	Rate of fire	Time to emplace (hours)
M-Gerät "Big Bertha"	42 cm (17 in)	42.6 t (41.9 long tons; 47.0 short tons)	9,300 m (30,500 ft)	8 shells an hour	5–6
Gamma-Gerät	42 cm (17 in)	150 t (150 long tons; 170 short tons)	14,000 m (46,000 ft)	8 shells an hour	24
Beta-M-Gerät	30.5 cm (12.0 in)	47 t (46 long tons; 52 short tons)	20,500 m (67,300 ft)	8 shells an hour	7–8
Beta-Gerät 09	30.5 cm (12.0 in)	45 t (44 long tons; 50 short tons)	12,000 m (39,000 ft)	12 shells an hour	12
Beta-Gerät	30.5 cm (12.0 in)	30 t (30 long tons; 33 short tons)	8,200 m (26,900 ft)	15 shells an hour	12

=== Ammunition ===
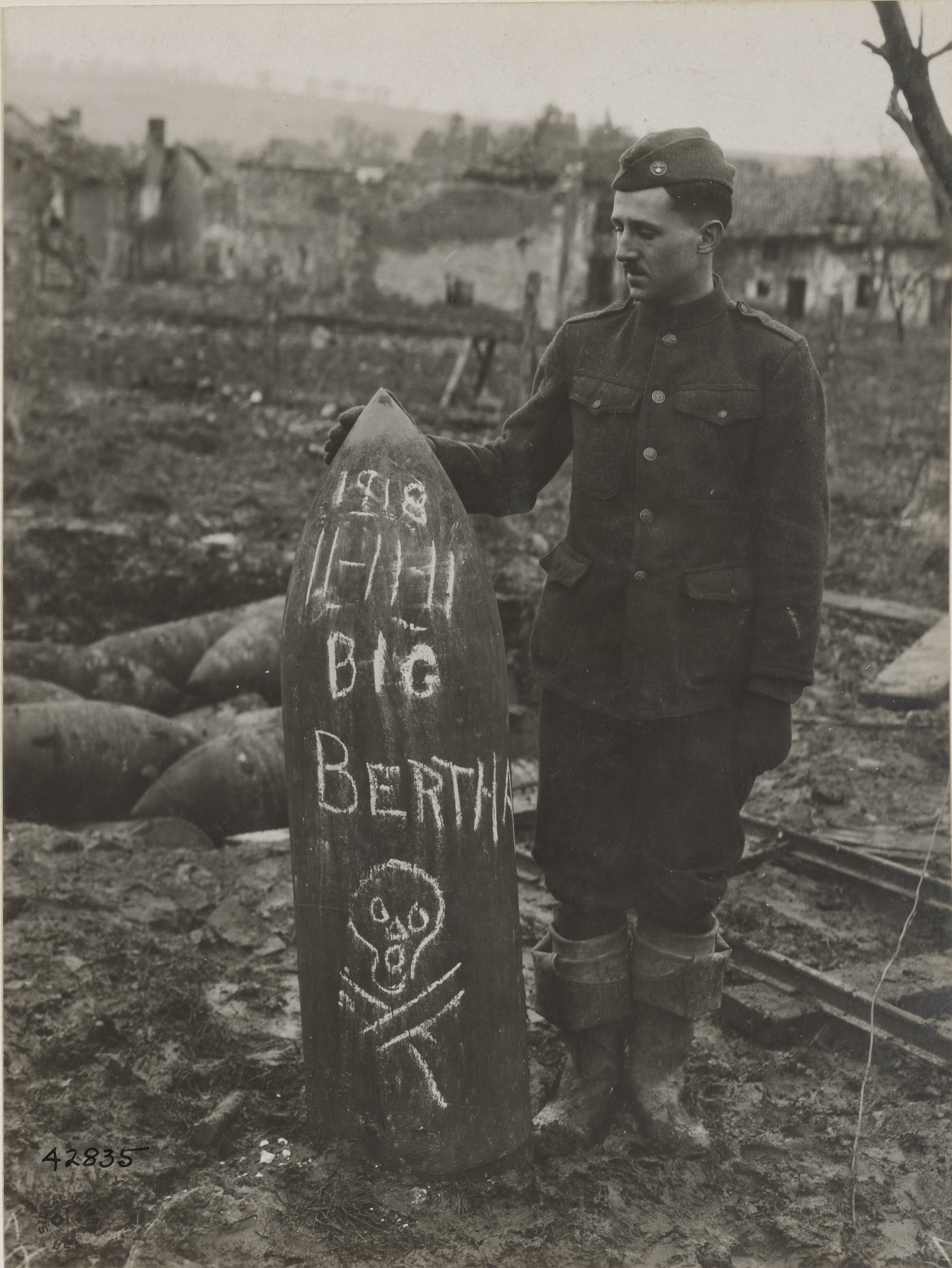
A 42 cm projectile in 1918

German siege artillery had three types of projectiles: armour-piercing, high-explosive and intermediate. The armour-piercing shell was designed to smash through concrete and metal armour but was largely ineffective against reinforced concrete. High-explosive shells were fitted with two charges and could be set to have no delay, a short delay or a long delay. If set to "no delay" the shell burst on impact. If set to a delayed detonation, it could penetrate up to 12 m (39 ft) of earth. Finally, the intermediate, or "short shell", weighed half as much as the high-explosive shell and was fitted with a ballistic tip for range and accuracy. Shells for the 42-centimetre guns were generally 1.5 m (4 ft 11 in) long, weighed between 400 and 1,160 kg (880 and 2,560 lb), and were propelled via primer loaded into the gun with a brass casing. Siege artillery shells were produced in limited runs of varying quality. Beginning in early 1916, German siege guns began to suffer internal explosions due to faulty ammunition. Crews were required to disembark from the gun before firing via a lanyard.

== Service history ==
The kurze Marinekanone (KMK) batteries that formed with M-Gerät guns were 3 (2 August 1914), 5 (June 1915), 6 (Summer 1915) and 7 (early 1916). Battery 3 was split in half in April 1916 to form 10 with a single M-Gerät each. The four Beta-M-Gerät guns produced were fielded by KMK Batteries 8 and 10 after their M-Gerät gun barrels had been destroyed by premature detonation. (Note: KMK Battery 8 had been formed with two Gamma-Gerät pieces in May 1916, which were replaced with two Beta-M-Gerät howitzers in early 1918.) When the German Army was reorganised in late 1918, only Battery 5 had M-Gerät guns, and schwere Küstenmörser (SKM) Battery 3 was assigned the remaining two Beta-M-Gerät guns.

=== Western Front ===
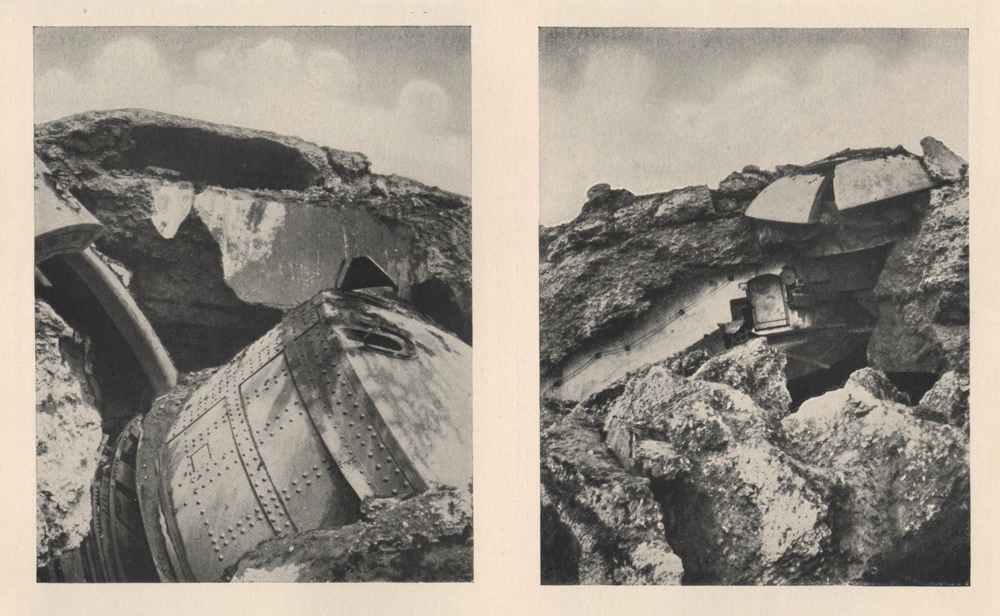
Ruins of the Fort de Loncin, 1914

By June 1914, the prototype M-Gerät howitzers had returned to Essen for final adjustments and would have been formed into a reserve artillery battery on completion in October. (Note: Siege guns were held in reserve as "non-standing batteries" that would be mobilised in the event of war. When mobilised, the batteries were assigned to Oberste Heeresleitung, which assigned the batteries to the Imperial Army by Corps.) On 2 August 1914, they were organised into KMK Battery 3 and sent to the Western Front with 240 men. On 4 August, the 1st Army arrived near Liège, Belgium, the first objective of the Schlieffen Plan and began the Battle of Liège. Although German troops entered the city on 7 August, its forts were firing upon the road to be taken by the 2nd Army and had to be reduced. Heavy artillery began their attack on 8 August. KMK Battery 3 was the first siege battery sent into battle to bombard the Fort de Pontisse on 12 August, which surrendered after two days. The battery next moved to the Fort de Liers but the fort surrendered as the battery was being emplaced. KMK Battery 3 relocated to the Fort de Loncin, where Gérard Leman directed the defence of Liège. Firing commenced on 15 August and lasted two hours, as the 25th shot fired struck a magazine and caused an explosion that destroyed the fort. The Germans carried Leman, unconscious, out of Loncin, and the last two forts, Hollogne and Flémalle, capitulated on 16 August.

With Liège captured, the 1st Army continued north-west while the 2nd and 3rd Armies marched to Namur, whose forts were undermanned, unmaintained, and poorly stocked with ammunition. The 2nd Army arrived on 20 August 1914 to open the Siege of Namur, but began their main attacks the following day with 400 pieces of artillery. KMK Battery 3 fired upon the Fort de Marchovelette, which was destroyed on 23 August by a magazine explosion. The battery shifted its fire to the Fort de Maizeret, already under bombardment by four Austro-Hungarian Skoda 30.5-centimetre guns, and compelled its surrender. With the eastern forts occupied, the Germans entered Namur and the remaining Belgian forces evacuated from the city.

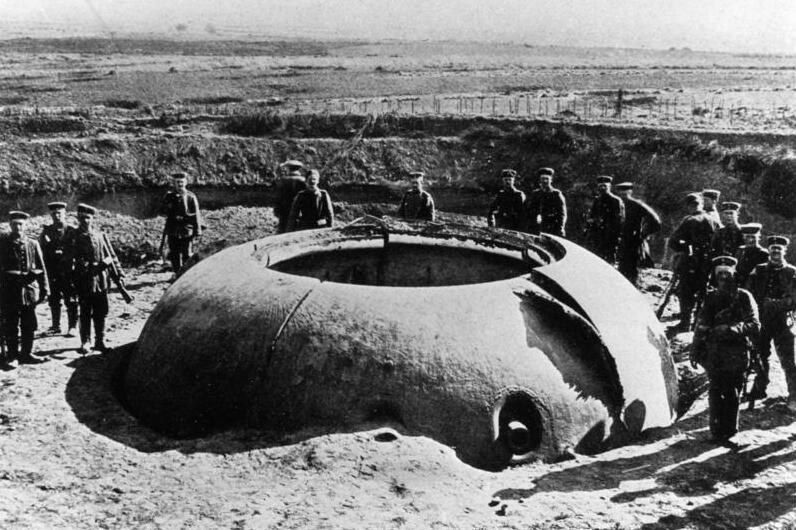
A ruined cupola at one of the Maubeuge forts, 1914

Following the defeat of the Western Allies at Charleroi and at Mons, the British Expeditionary Force withdrew past Maubeuge, their base of operations after arriving in France. On 24 August 1914, the advancing Germans arrived at the fortresses of Maubeuge and began the Siege of Maubeuge and its garrison of 45,000 soldiers. The next day, the VII Reserve Corps were left behind the main German armies to take the city. Bombardment of the forts began on 30 August, with KMK Battery 3 tasked with reducing Ouvrage Les Sarts (Fort Sarts) but it mistakenly shelled an interval fortification in front of Sarts. By 5 September, a hole in the fortress ring had been opened by German 21-centimetre guns, but they had by now exhausted their ammunition. To widen that gap, the siege guns then expended their remaining ammunition against Forts Leveau, Héronfontaine, and Cerfontaine on 7 September, and destroyed them in quick succession. The two remaining French forts surrendered that same day and the Germans occupied Maubeuge on 8 September.

With Maubeuge taken, German siege guns were available for an attack on Paris, but Germany's defeat at the Battle of the Marne blocked the advance of the 1st and 2nd Armies, and the guns were instead sent to Antwerp. King Albert I had ordered a general retreat to Antwerp on 18 August, and his army arrived in the city two days later. From Antwerp, Albert made attacks on the German flank on 24–25 August and 9 September, prompting General Alexander von Kluck of the 1st Army to send the III Reserve Corps to seize Antwerp. It arrived and partially surrounded Antwerp from the south-west on September 27, and bombardment began the next day. KMK Battery 3 arrived on 30 September and opened fire on the Fort de Lier, whose artillery narrowly missed the battery. The fort was abandoned by its garrison on 2 October, allowing KMK Battery 3 to attack and destroy the Fort de Kessel in a day. The battery then moved to attack the Fort de Broechem, which was also destroyed within two days. From 7 to 9 October, the Belgian army fled from Antwerp and the city surrendered on 10 October.

Early in 1916, all 42-centimetre guns were assigned to the 5th Army, which amassed a total of 24 siege guns, the highest concentration of them during the war. The Battle of Verdun was opened on 21 February 1916 with an intense, nine-hour long artillery bombardment. The 42-centimetre guns had to suppress the artillery of Forts Vaux, Douaumont, Souville and Moulainville but were unable to penetrate the concrete of the modern fortresses. On the second day of the battle, both of KMK Battery 7's M-Gerät guns were destroyed by premature detonations and KMK Batteries 5 and 6 both lost an M-Gerät each to the same cause. Most of the siege guns at Verdun were moved north in July to participate in the Battle of the Somme, and by September the only M-Gerät units left in Verdun were KMK Batteries 3 and 6.

In the final two years of the war, KMK batteries that suffered losses of their big guns had them replaced with smaller–calibre weapons. Those that remained primarily shelled field works and often had low survivability due to malfunctions or Allied counter-battery artillery. KMK Battery 10 lost one M-Gerät to a premature detonation and the other to British warships near Ostend in August 1917 and was rearmed with captured Russian 12 cm (4.7 in) howitzers. It and KMK Battery 10 were given the four Beta-M-Geräts made during the war in early 1918. For the German spring offensive, KMK Battery 8 was assigned to the 6th Army, Battery 6 to the 2nd Army, and Battery 3 to the 18th Army. The effect of the siege guns was negligible. For Germany's final offensive in July 1918, KMK Batteries 5 and 6 were reassigned to the 7th Army at the Marne, while Batteries 3, 8 and 10 went to the 1st Army at Reims. The batteries again had little to no effect, and Battery 10 became the last German siege battery to fire on a fort, the Fort de la Pompelle. In November 1918, KMK Battery 5 surrendered its guns, the remaining two M-Gerät howitzers, to the American Expeditionary Force.

=== Eastern Front ===
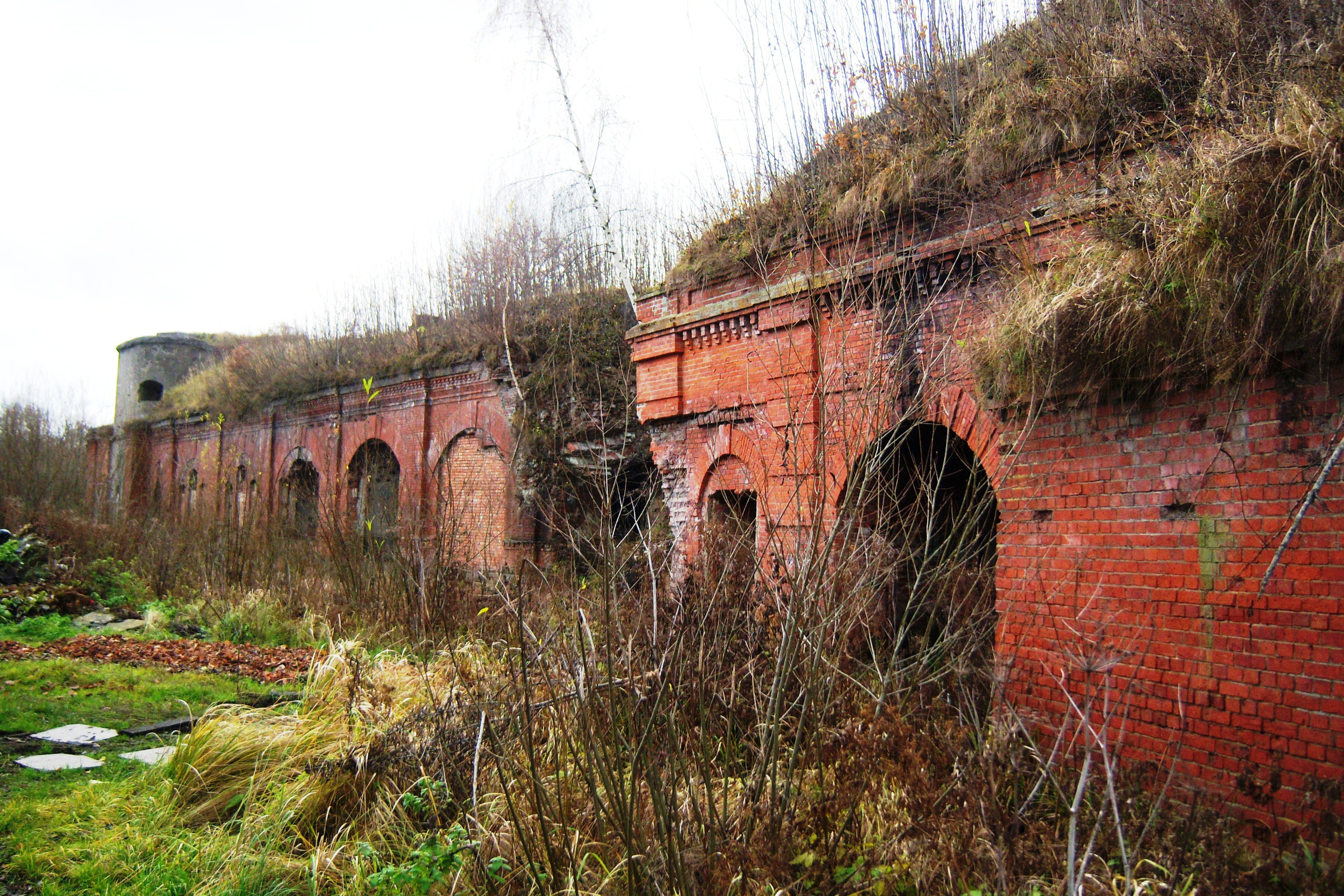
Kaunas's Fort II in ruins, 2011

On 2 May 1915, August von Mackensen launched the Gorlice-Tarnow Offensive. By the end of the month, his forces neared Przemyśl, which had been captured by the Russians from Austria-Hungary on 22 March 1915. KMK Battery 6 took part in the bombardment of forts X, Xa, XI and XIa, opened on 30 March. Two days later, the Germans took and held forts X, Xa and XI against counter-attack, compelling the Russians to abandon Przemyśl. German troops entered the city on 3 June, then took the remaining forts two days later. From 8 August, KMK Battery 6 supported the XXXX Reserve Corps in its attack on Kaunas Fortress by bombarding Kaunas's three westernmost forts. Although the German siege artillery's shelling of Kaunas was slow, the fortifications were outdated and were easily destroyed. The city fell on 18 August.

To the south, KMK Batteries 3 and 5 participated in the siege of Novogeorgievsk, which the Germans had surrounded on 10 August. On 13 August, KMK Batteries 3 and 5 attacked with the siege guns from the north, shelling forts XIV, XV and XVI. On 16 August, German infantry stormed forts XV and XVI as the artillery bombarded them. A 42-centimetre shell struck German troops attacking Fort XV, resulting in heavy casualties but the Germans took the forts. The Russians abandoned the outer ring on 18 August, allowing the Germans to open a hole in the inner ring and capture Novogeorgievsk the next day. The Russians abandoned fortresses wholesale during the Great Retreat. At Grodno, KMK Batteries 3, 5, and 6 were not even fully emplaced when the fortress was evacuated on 3 September. The last deployment of M-Gerät guns on the Eastern Front was in October 1915, when KMK Battery 6 was attached to the German 11th Army as it invaded Serbia.

== Replicas and legacy ==
The nickname "Big Bertha" appeared early in the war, when German soldiers named the guns Dicke Berta at the Battle of Liège, a reference to Bertha Krupp, who had inherited the Krupp works from her father. The name spread to German newspapers and then to Allied troops as "Big Bertha" and became slang for all heavy German artillery, but especially the 42-centimetre guns. The name has since entered the public consciousness, for example being applied as a moniker to a line of Callaway golf clubs, a satirical French-language magazine, and a bond-buying policy by Mario Draghi, President of the European Central Bank.

Two M-Gerät guns were surrendered to the US Army at Spincourt in November 1918. One was taken to the United States, evaluated and then put on display at the Aberdeen Proving Ground, while the other was left unassembled in its transport configuration. Both were scrapped in 1943 and the early 1950s. World War I veteran Emil Cherubin built a replica of an M-Gerät, which toured Germany and appeared on a few postage stamps. The Paris Gun, a railway gun developed during the war and used to bomb Paris in 1918, has historically been confused with the M-Gerät since World War I.

== See also ==
- List of the largest cannon by caliber
- German WW II Karl-Gerät SP mortar
