= Fortified Sector of Maubeuge =

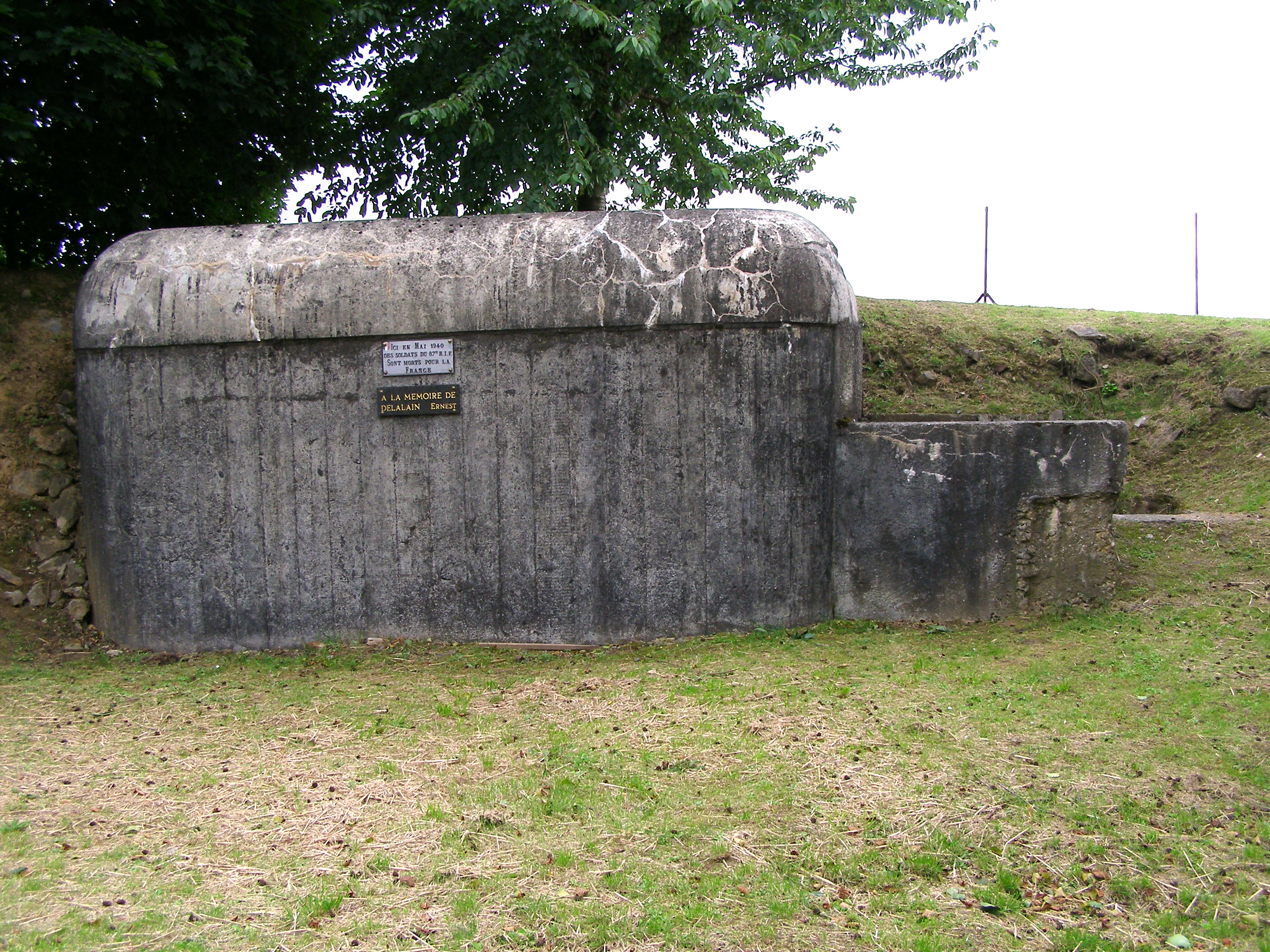
Blockhouse at the Fort de Leveau

The Fortified Sector of Maubeuge (Secteur Fortifié de Maubeuge) was the French military organization that in 1940 controlled the section of the Maginot Line between the French border with Belgium and Maubeuge, a distance of about 70 kilometres (43 mi). The sector was not as strongly defended as other sections of the Maginot Line; large portions of the Maubeuge sector were defended by blockhouses or casemates. The sector includes only four ouvrages of the type found in stronger sections of the Line, arranged in an arc to the north and east of the fortified city of Maubeuge, incorporating defenses from the First World War. The Maubeuge sector and the Fortified Sector of the Escaut were the final sections of the Maginot line to be authorized, and were termed the "New Fronts". In the Battle of France, the large fortifications of Maubeuge successfully resisted determined German bombardments and infantry attacks, despite their failure to protect Maubeuge against the Germans, who had outflanked the defensive line and who assaulted the fortification lines from the rear. Surrender or evacuation came only after the positions were surrounded and cut off from any hope of reinforcement. One ouvrage and one pre-Maginot fortification have been preserved.

== Concept and organization ==
Initial work in the sector established a series of casemates in the Mormal Forest, well to the rear of Maubeuge. The casemates were built by the Commission d'Organisation des Régions Fortifiées (CORF), the Maginot Line's design and construction agency. At the same time, studies proceeded on the fortification of the exposed salients, or môles, of Bavai and Maubeuge. As the fortification of the Maubeuge Front was commenced later than the main section of the Line to the east, funds were restricted by the impact of the Great Depression, which had reached France. A relatively ambitious project was nevertheless advanced, planning for five artillery ouvrages (Eth, Bavai, Quatre-Bras, L'Épine and Boussois) between Valenciennes and the Ardennes. The plan was progressively scaled back to four infantry ouvrages in front of Maubeuge, resembling larger-than-usual casemates more than the mutually supporting artillery positions of the main Line. Sarts and Boussois, the last-surviving artillery ouvrages, were reduced to infantry positions. Geological and groundwater conditions made construction of deep ouvrages of the kind found in the main Line difficult in the Maubeuge area. The plan was also affected by political considerations, in which the fortification of the Belgian frontier was seen as a betrayal of the French plan for forward defense on Belgian territory. The CORF lines were augmented by lesser positions in the principal line of resistance constructed in 1937–38, backed by further fortifications about 1,500 metres (4,900 ft) to the rear, built in 1940. A total of 300 fortifications were built to cover 70 kilometres (43 mi) of frontier, but in 1940 there were only enough fortress troops to fully man the CORF positions and 125 of the hastily built reinforcing positions.

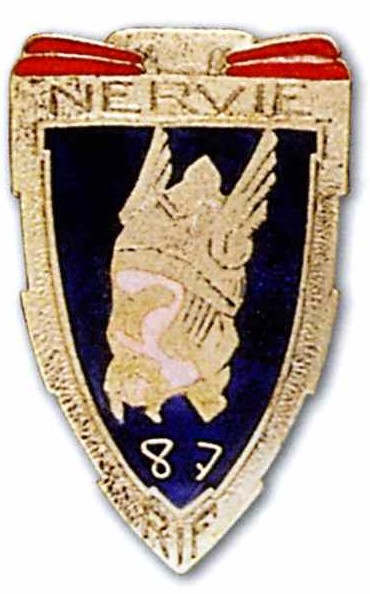
Insignia of the 87th RIF.

== Command ==
The Maubeuge sector was under the overall command of the French 1st Army, under the command of General Blanchard, which was in turn part of Army Group 1 under General Gaston Billotte. From 16 March 1940, the sector became the 101st Fortress Infantry Division. The SF Maubeuge was commanded by General Hanaut, then General Béjard from 1 January 1940. The command post was at the Wargnories farm.

== Description ==
The sector included, in order from west to east, the following major fortified positions, together with the most significant casemates and infantry shelters in each sub-sector: (Note: English-language sources use the French term ouvrage as the preferred term for the Maginot positions, in preference to "fort", a term usually reserved for older fortifications with passive defenses in the form of walls and ditches. The literal translation of ouvrage in the sense of a fortification in English is "work". A gros ouvrage is a large fortification with a significant artillery component, while a petit ouvrage is smaller, with lighter arms.) In addition to the cancelled ouvrages mentioned below, the Ouvrage de Bavai was also planned for the sector, but never built.

=== Sub-sector of Hainaut ===
87th Fortress Infantry Regiment (87e Régiment d'Infanterie de Forteresse (RIF)), Lt. Colonel Corbeil

Resistance line (FCR/RM):

- Blockhaus du Grand-Condé Ouest
- Blockhaus du Grand-Condé Est
- Blockhaus du Bois-Crête
- Blockhaus du Bois-Crête (2)
- Blockhaus de la Tournichette
- Blockhaus de la Flamengrie
- Blockhaus de Ruaince
- Blockhaus de la Perche-Rompue
- Blockhaus de la Ferme-de-la-Tour
- Blockhaus de Saint Vaast-la-Vallé
- Blockhaus de la Talpiette
- Blockhaus de la Belle-Hôtesse
- Blockhaus du Quêne-Luquet
- Blockhaus de Houdain Sud-Est
- Blockhaus de la Chemin-de-Fer Ouest
- Blockhaus de la Chemin-de-Fer Est
- Blockhaus du Petit-Chêne
- Blockhaus de la Croix-Capouillez Est
- Blockhaus de la Carlotte
- Blockhaus de Tasnières
- Blockhaus de la Riez-de-l'Erelle
- Blockhaus de Malplaquet Ouest
- Blockhaus de Malplaquet Est
- Blockhaus du Bois-de-la-Lanière (1–10)
- Blockhaus du Bois-de-la-Lanière
- Blockhaus du Bois-des-Écoliers
- Blockhaus de la Chapelle-Saint-Joseph
- Blockhaus du Pavillon Ouest
- Blockhaus du Pavillon Est

105th CEO

- Casemate d'Héronfontaine
- Ouvrage Les Sarts, petit ouvrage of two combat blocks
- Blockhaus de Saint-Pierre-d'Hautmont
- Blockhaus du Grand-Camp-Perdu

104th CEO

- Casemate de Crèvecoeur
- Ouvrage Bersillies, petit ouvrage of two combat blocks

103rd CEO

- Ouvrage La Salmagne, petit ouvrage of two combat blocks
- Blockhaus de la Cimitière-d'Elesmes
- Blockhaus del la Ferme-Kean-Ansart

Stop line (FCR/STG/RM)

- Blockhaus de la Warpe
- Abri de la Warpe
- Abri de Ruisseau-des-Bultaix
- Blockhaus de Preux-du-Sart
- Blockhaus de la Chapelle-Saint-Hubert
- Blockhaus de la Râperie
- Blockhaus du Bracmart
- Blockhaus du Boëte
- Blockhaus de la Ferme-Cambron
- Blockhaus du Moulin-de-Rametz
- Blockhaus de Pissotiau
- Blockhas de la Cimitière-de-Saint-Vaast
- Blockhaus de Louvignies
- Blockhaus de la Ferme-Fréhart
- Blockhaus d'Audignies
- Blockhaus du Bois-de-Louvignies
- Blockhaus du Frêne
- Blockhaus de Longueville
- Blockhaus du Moulin-du-Bois
- Blockhaus du Gors-Chêne
- Blockhaus de la Berlière
- Blockhaus de la Roullie
- Blockhaus du Fort-Leveau (Plantis)
- Blockhaus de la Ferme-Lepers
- Blockhaus de la Ferme-des-Sarts
- Blockhaus de la Maison-Rouge
- Blockhaus du Faubourg-de-Mons-Ouest
- Blockhaus du Faubourg-de-Mons-Est
- Blockhaus du Pont-Allant

Reinforcing Line, Mormal Forest

- Casemate de Gommegnies Ouest
- Casemate de Gommegnies Est
- Casemate du Cheval-Blanc
- Casemate de Tréchon
- Casemate de Clare
- Casemate d'Obies
- Casemate du Bon-Wez
- Casemate Ouest du Vivier-Nuthiau
- Casemate Est du Vivier-Nuthiau
- Casemate de la Haute-Rue
- Casemate de la Poquerie Ouest
- Casemate de la Porquerie Est
- Casemate de Hurtebise

=== Sub-sector of Thièrache ===
84th Fortress Infantry Regiment (84e Régiment d'Infanterie de Forteresse (RIF)), Lt. Colonel Marchal

- Blockhaus du Bois-d'Elesmes Nord
- Blockhaus du Warinet

102nd CEO

- Casemate de l'Épinette
- Casemate d'Ostergnies
- Ouvrage Boussois, petit ouvrage of three combat blocks
- Blockhaus de Recquignies
- Blockhaus de l'Hogniau
- Blockhaus de la Buchelotte

101st CEO

- Casemate du Rocq
- Casemate du Bois-de-Marpent Nord
- Casemate du Bois-de-Marpent Sud, planned to be linked with Marpent Nord and Rocq; shafts excavated, but the underground galleries were not completed. This would have become Ouvrage Marpent, a petit ouvrage
- Casemate d'Ostergnies
- Blockhaus du Fief
- Blockhaus des Tous-Vents Nord
- Blockhaus des Tous-Vents Sud
- Blockhaus de Petit-Branleux
- Blockhaus de Colleret
- Blockhaus de Falquemont Nord
- Ouvrage de Quatre-Bras, gros ouvrage, never built
- Blockhaus de Quatre-Bras
- Blockhaus de Falquemont Sud
- Blockhaus Est d'Ostergnies
- Blockhaus du Noisier
- Blockhaus de Cayaut
- Blockhaus de la Pavé
- Blockhaus de Coulmie-Bras
- Blockhaus de Coulmie-Haut
- Blockhaus de Coulmie-Haut bis
- Blockhaus d'Aibes
- Blockhaus du Bout d'en Haut
- Blockhaus du Bout d'en Haut bis
- Blockhaus de Bérelles
- Blockhaus de la Ferme-d'en-Bas
- Blockhaus de la Ferme-de-la-Folie
- Blockhaus des Champs-Élysées
- Blockhaus du Bois-de-Nielles
- Blockhaus de Malakoff (2)
- Blockhaus de Groëz
- Blockhaus de Solre-le-Château (Riamé)
- Blockhaus de la Perche-à-l'Oiseau
- Blockhaus de la Gobinette
- Blockhaus de Trieux-du-Chêneau
- Blockhaus des Garennes
- Blockhaus de Mon-Plaisir
- Ouvrage de l'Epine, gros ouvrage, never built
- Blockhaus de l'Épine
- Blockhaus de la Ferme-aux-Puces
- Blockhaus de la Ferme-des-Fils-de-Fer
- Blockhaus de la Ferme Clavon
- Blockhaus de Trieux-Anicole
- Blockhaus du Garde-de-Willies
- Blockhaus de Beaumont
- Blockhaus des Beaux-Monts
- Blockhaus de Liessies
- Blockhaus de la Croix-de-Trélon
- Blockhaus de Champiau
- Blockhaus de Sainte-Hiltrude
- Blockhaus du Beau-Chêne
- Blockhaus de la Fond-Saint-Jean
- Blockhaus de la Route-de-Willies
- Blockhaus du Fond-Madame

Second position

- Blockhaus de Bellevue Nord
- Blockhaus de Bellevue Sud
- Blockhaus de Belleux
- Blockhaus des Beaux-Sarts

== History ==
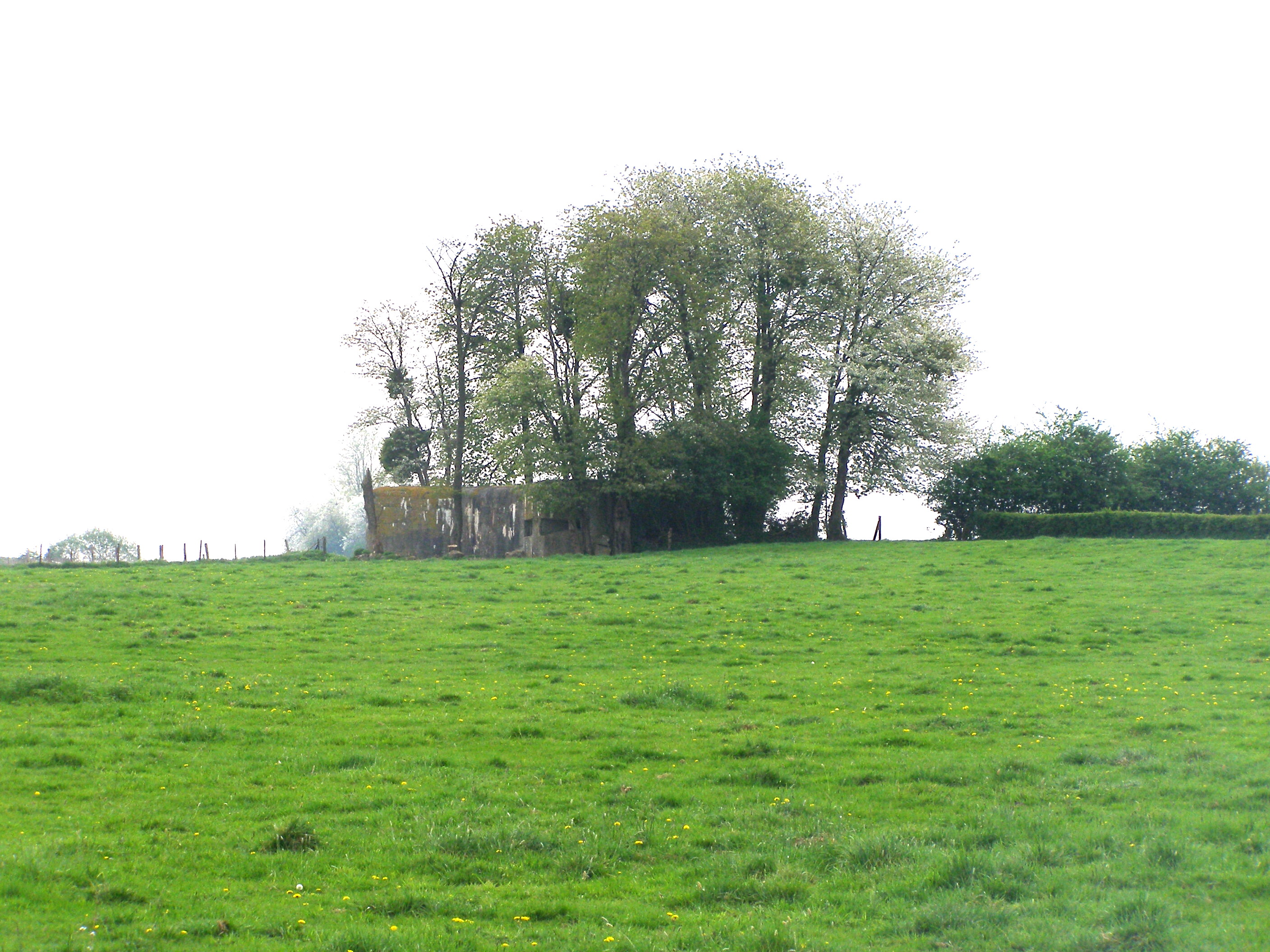
The Élesmes blockhouse

=== Battle of France ===
On 16 May 1940, elements of German Army Group A, including the German 8th and 28th Infantry Divisions crossed the Belgian-French border, heading east along the frontier, directly for Maubeuge. Just to the south the German 5th and 7th Panzer Divisions moved on a parallel line, along with the German 12th Infantry Division. The retreating French 1st and 9th Armies fell back to Maubeuge. The 28th ID and the 5th Panzer Division quickly moved against Maubeuge from the south, capturing the city's Vauban citadel on 17–18 May. Fort de Leveau to the northwest of Maubeuge fell on 18 May, a victim of German forces that had moved behind Maubeuge. By the 19th the German formations had rolled up the fortification lines along their path, and had encircled the remaining Maubeuge fortifications. Boussois, the easternmost ouvrage, came under attack on the 18th from the 28th ID and the 5th Panzer Division. As the day wore on, Ouvrage La Salmagne, Ouvrage Bersillies and Ouvrage Les Sarts all came under fire from the rear. Each position resisted fiercely, holding off the attack for several days, despite direct fire by German 8.8cm anti-tank guns that progressively reduced their ability to respond. Boussois and Les Sarts came under attack by Stukas on 20 May. The Héronfontaine casemate came under sustained attack on 21 May, and a German 210mm mortar began firing on Boussois the same day. The bombardments continued, but were not able to bring about a surrender. Infantry assaults eventually reduced the positions one by one: Boussois at 1100 and La Salmagne at 2030 hours on 22 May, Bersillies at 1015 on 23 May with the nearby casemate Crèvecoeur, and finally Les Sarts at 1100 on 23 May. The garrison of casemate Héronfontaine held out until nightfall, when they were able to slip away.

As the ouvrages came under attack, the surrounding blockhouses were being reduced one by one. The 5th Panzer Division moved into the Mormal Forest and cleared the defensive line there, where a major four-day battle had taken place between French and German mechanized forces. Despite the fierceness of the fighting around Maubeuge, casualties on both sides were light. The delay allowed a significant portion of the 84th RIF to escape to the Dunkirk pocket to be evacuated to England, while the 87th RIF escaped to Normandy to be captured weeks later.

The Germans stripped the Maubeuge fortifications during the Occupation, removing weapons for re-use and salvaging the massive steel cloches for scrap. While Maginot fortifications in other sectors were restored for further use during the Cold War, the SF Maubeuge was not reactivated.

==== Units ====
The 84th Fortress Infantry Regiment occupied the sub-sector of Thiérache, spending the winter of 1939–1940 building the Avesnes belt of light fortifications. The regiment's second and third battalions faced Rommel's 7th Panzer Division. As German forces reduced the defenses the individual battalions were compelled to retreat. The first battalion was captured at Blarégnies on 22 and 23 May. The remaining units made their way to Dunkerque where they were evacuated to England in the Dunkirk evacuation. Four years later the unit returned as part of the French 54th Infantry Regiment, which was captured by German forces in the Falaise area on 17 and 18 June 1944.

The 87th Fortress Infantry Regiment manned the Hainaut sub-sector. Attacked from 17 May, the regiment began to fall back to Erguennes on 20 May, while the fortified positions held out until 23 May. The first battalion was able to escape to Dunkerque and was evacuated. The unit formed part of the ill-fated 54th IR in Normandy, and was captured at Falaise.

== Present status ==
La Salmagne is managed by a preservation society and is occasionally open to the public. Fort de Leveau is preserved by the town of Feignies and its World War II era additions are preserved as well.

== Bibliography ==
- Allcorn, William. The Maginot Line 1928–45. Oxford: Osprey Publishing, 2003. ISBN 1-84176-646-1
- Degon, André; Zylberyng, Didier, La Ligne Maginot: Guide des Forts à Visiter, Editions Ouest-France, 2014. ISBN 978-2-7373-6080-0 (in French)
- Kaufmann, J. E. and Kaufmann, H. W. Fortress France: The Maginot Line and French Defenses in World War II, Stackpole Books, 2006. ISBN 0-275-98345-5
- Kaufmann, J. E., Kaufmann, H. W., Jancovič-Potočnik, A. and Lang, P. The Maginot Line: History and Guide, Pen and Sword, 2011. ISBN 978-1-84884-068-3
- Mary, Jean-Yves; Hohnadel, Alain; Sicard, Jacques. Hommes et Ouvrages de la Ligne Maginot, vol. 1. Paris, Histoire & Collections, 2001. ISBN 2-908182-88-2 (in French)
- Mary, Jean-Yves; Hohnadel, Alain; Sicard, Jacques. Hommes et Ouvrages de la Ligne Maginot, vol. 3. Paris, Histoire & Collections, 2003. ISBN 2-913903-88-6 (in French)
- Mary, Jean-Yves; Hohnadel, Alain; Sicard, Jacques. Hommes et Ouvrages de la Ligne Maginot, vol. 5. Paris, Histoire & Collections, 2009. ISBN 978-2-35250-127-5 (in French)
- Romanych, Marc; Rupp, Martin. Maginot Line 1940: Battles on the French Frontier. Oxford: Osprey, 2010. ISBN 1-84176-646-1
