= Fort de Leveau =

- Part of Fortifications of Maubeuge, Séré de Rivières system
- Feignies, France
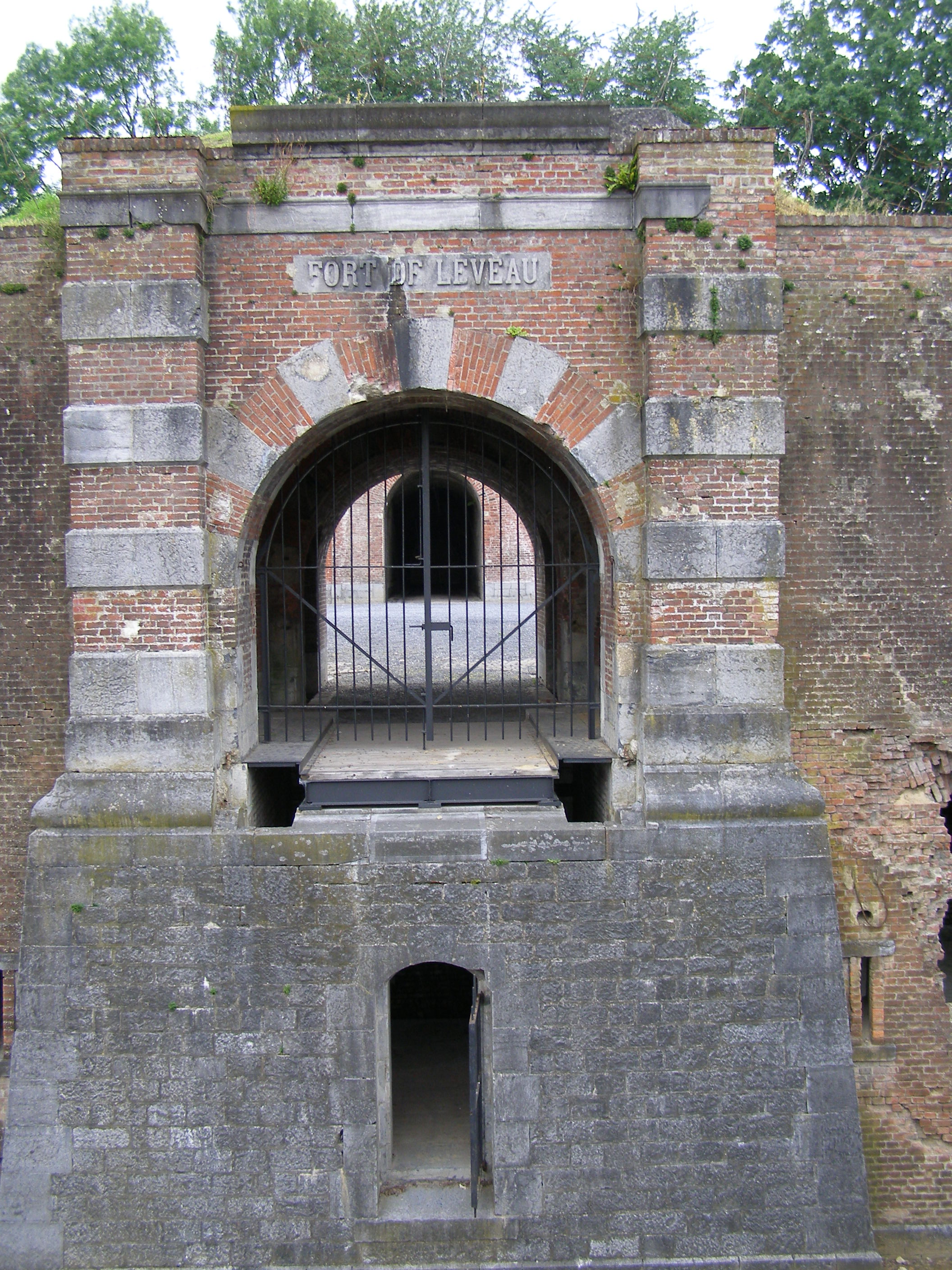

Site information
- Type: Fort
- Owner: Town of Feignies
- Controlled by: France
- Open to the public: Yes

Location
- Location within France
- Coordinates: 50.29944°N 3.94179°E

Site history
- Built: 1882
- Materials: Masonry, concrete
- Battles/wars: Siege of Maubeuge, Battle of France

The Fort de Leveau, also known as Fort Schouller, is located in the commune of Feignies, France. It is part of the fortifications of Maubeuge, located to the northwest of the city, overlooking the railroad to Mons. The Séré de Rivières system fort was built 1882–1884, one of six forts built at the time. It is maintained as a museum by the town of Feignies.

== Description ==
The fort is a typical example of a Séré de Rivières system, with a low wall, surrounded by a ditch, which is in turn defended by caponiers. The roof of the barracks is concreted and supports an artillery platform, or cavalier. The ditch was traversed by a drawbridge, no longer extant. The position was heavily bombarded in 1914. In 1893, four 120mm guns were mounted on the cavalier, while additional armament including 90mm guns were added in casemates. A 1914 project added a turret for two 75mm guns. However, the turret was not armed and equipped at the outbreak of World War I.

In the 1930s the fort was chosen as a site for fortifications associated with the Maginot Line extension around Maubeuge, part of the "New Fronts" program. An observation post, a casemate and a blockhouse were built on the fort. The casemate was furnished with a 25mm anti-tank gun, a machine gun port and an automatic rifle port.

== History ==
In 1870, France was partly occupied by the Prussian army. As a result of this defeat, the Séré de Rivières system of fortifications was planned and constructed to defend the nation. Maubeuge, located close by the border between France and Belgium, received a complete ring of forts. Construction started in 1882, completing in 1884 for a garrison of 97 men. The armament was improved in 1893, and the fort was renovated again in 1914.

In the opening stages of World War I the German army laid siege to Maubeuge, beginning 29 August 1914. On 7 September, the Fort de Leveau was bombarded by 25 42 cm projectiles and a number of 30.5 cm rounds, heavily damaging the fort, with one shot hitting the barracks and killing up to 120. At 1400 on the 7th, French forces evacuated the fort, shortly before the general surrender of the Maubeuge fortress. After occupying the fort, the Germans blew up the caponiers, the unfinished 75mm gun turret and other portions of the fort.

In the 1930s, France invested in the construction of the Maginot Line, which covered the eastern frontiers of France. The frontier with Belgium was regarded as a lesser priority because France's war plan called for the French Army to advance into Belgium and conduct an offensive there. Belatedly, France began construction of a limited series of defenses around Maubeuge in the mid-1930s. These fortifications were individually assaulted and captured in the opening phases of World War II. The Leveau fortifications were attacked on 18 May 1940 and were subdued that afternoon, with one defender dead. In 1944 the fort saw fighting between Resistance and German forces.

The site was acquired by the town of Feignies in 1993 and is administered as a museum by the Association de Sauvegrade du Fort de Leveau. In 1998, excavations recovered the remains of nine soldiers killed in the 1914 siege, who were re-interred at the Assevent cemetery.

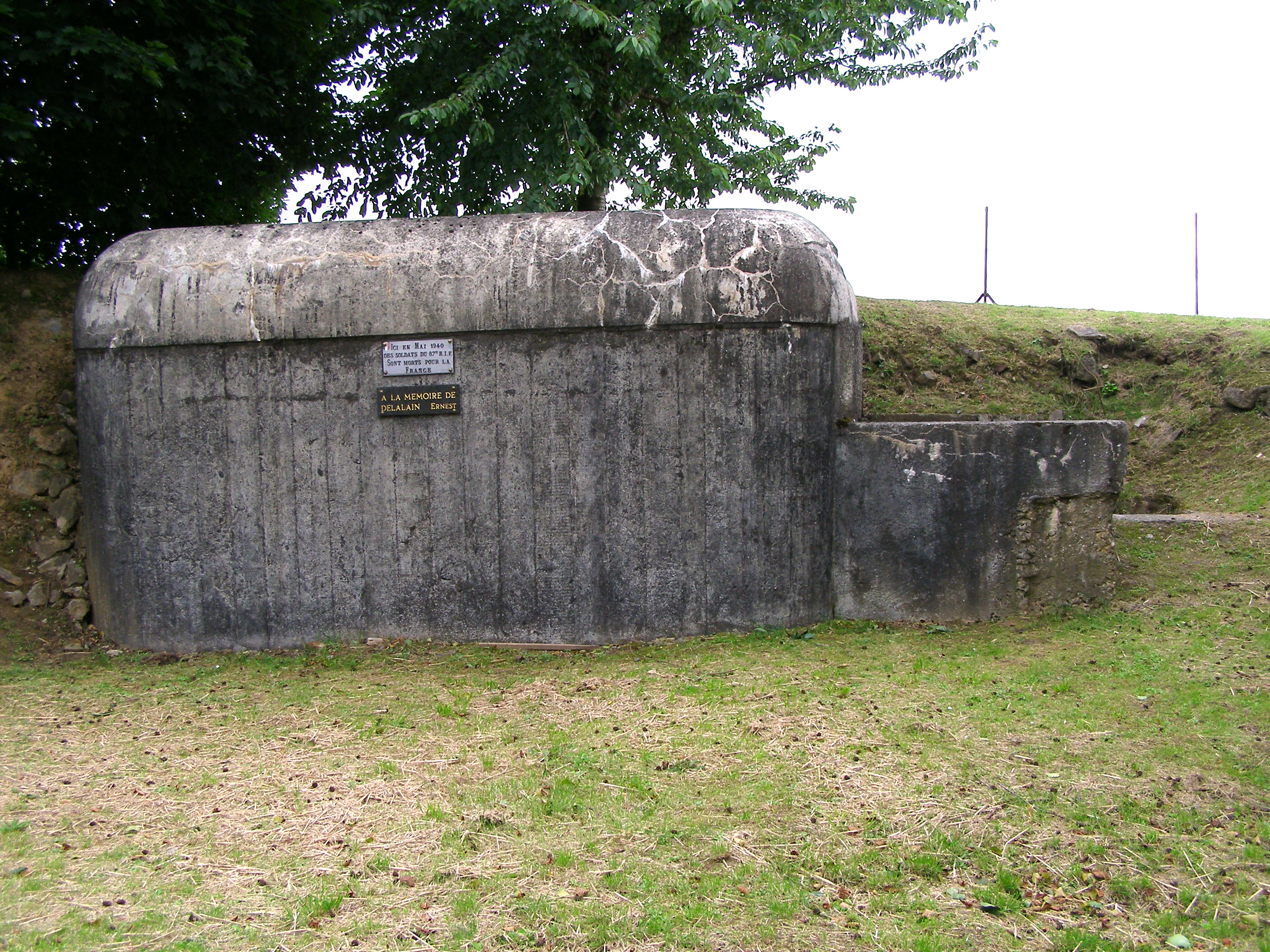
Casemate du Leveau
