= Ouvrage Les Sarts =

- Part of Maginot Line New Frontiers, Séré de Rivières system
- Northern France

Site information
- Controlled by: France

Location
- Coordinates: 50.31875°N 3.97263°E

Site history
- Built: 1934–1938
- Materials: Concrete, steel, deep excavation, masonry
- Battles/wars: Siege of Maubeuge, Battle of France

Ouvrage Les Sarts is a petit ouvrage of the Maginot Line, built as part of the "New Fronts" program to address shortcomings in the Line's coverage of the border with Belgium. Like the other three ouvrages near Maubeuge, it is built on an old Séré de Rivières system fortification, near the town of Marieux.

== Séré de Rivières ==
The original Fort des Sarts was built to the west of Marieux in 1878-1881 as part of the Séré de Rivières fortifications of Maubeuge. The pentagonal fort is surrounded by a ditch defended by counterscarps. In 1914 the fort was upgraded with a 75mm gun turret. The position was planned to cover the N2 road to Mons. Bersillies was attacked by German forces in 1914 during the Siege of Maubeuge, suffering heavy large-caliber artillery bombardment from the first day of the siege. Isolated far behind the front lines, it surrendered to the Germans with the other Maubeuge fortifications on 7 September 1914, with its works almost completely destroyed.

== Design and construction ==
The Maginot-era site was approved in 1934. Work cost 10.5 million francs.

== Description ==
The Maginot-era improvements to Sarts comprise two combat blocks. The ouvrage (Note: English-language sources use the French term ouvrage as the preferred term for the Maginot positions, in preference to "fort", a term usually reserved for older fortifications with passive defenses in the form of walls and ditches. The literal translation of ouvrage in the sense of a fortification in English is "work." A Maginot gros ouvrage is a large fortification with a significant artillery component, while a petit ouvrage is smaller, with lighter arms.) was built within the walls of the old Fort des Sarts. An underground gallery connects the two blocks. A second phase was planned to provide two artillery blocks armed with one 75mm twin gun turret each, as well as an entry block outside the walls of the old fort.

- Block 1: infantry/entry block with one automatic rifle cloche (GFM-B), one mixed-arms cloche (AM), one grenade launcher cloche (LG), six automatic rifle embrasures and one and one rmachine gun/47mm anti-tank gun (JM/AC47) embrasure.
- Block 2: infantry/entrance block with two GFM cloches, one AM cloche, one retractable twin machine gun turret and two automatic rifle embrasures.

A number of small blockhouses are associated with Les Sarts, as well as a casemate:

- Casemate de Héronfontaine: Single block with one JM/AC47 embrasure, one JM embrasure, a mixed-arms AM/50mm mortar turret and two GFM-B cloches. It is not connected to the ouvrage

== Manning ==
The 1940 manning of the ouvrage under the command of Captain Leduc comprised 100 men and 2 officers of the 84th Fortress Infantry Regiment. The units were under the umbrella of the 101st Fortress Infantry Division, 1st Army, Army Group 1.

== History of the Maginot ouvrage ==
See Fortified Sector of Maubeuge for a broader discussion of the events of 1940 in the Maubeuge sector of the Maginot Line.

During the Battle of France in 1940, the invading German forces approached Maubeuge from the south and east, to the rear of the defensive line. The German 28th Infantry Division moved along the line of fortifications 19–22 May, rolling up blockhouses and larger fortifications. Les Sarts first took fire on 21 May, with a Stuka raid on 22 May. Heavy fire from the rear continued on 23 May, gradually reducing the fort's defenses. At 1100 hours, with all means of resistance gone, les Sarts surrendered, the last ouvrage of the defenses of Maubeuge to do so.

== Current ==
Les Sarts is not accessible to the public. It is reported to be in poor condition, with all metal salvaged.

== See also ==
- List of all works on Maginot Line
- Siegfried Line
- Atlantic Wall
- Czechoslovak border fortifications

== Bibliography ==
- Allcorn, William. The Maginot Line 1928-45. Oxford: Osprey Publishing, 2003. ISBN 1-84176-646-1
- Kaufmann, J.E. and Kaufmann, H.W. Fortress France: The Maginot Line and French Defenses in World War II, Stackpole Books, 2006. ISBN 0-275-98345-5
- Kaufmann, J.E., Kaufmann, H.W., Jancovič-Potočnik, A. and Lang, P. The Maginot Line: History and Guide, Pen and Sword, 2011. ISBN 978-1-84884-068-3
- Mary, Jean-Yves; Hohnadel, Alain; Sicard, Jacques. Hommes et Ouvrages de la Ligne Maginot, Tome 1. Paris, Histoire & Collections, 2001. ISBN 2-908182-88-2 (in French)
- Mary, Jean-Yves; Hohnadel, Alain; Sicard, Jacques. Hommes et Ouvrages de la Ligne Maginot, Tome 2. Paris, Histoire & Collections, 2003. ISBN 2-908182-97-1 (in French)
- Mary, Jean-Yves; Hohnadel, Alain; Sicard, Jacques. Hommes et Ouvrages de la Ligne Maginot, Tome 3. Paris, Histoire & Collections, 2003. ISBN 2-913903-88-6 (in French)
- Mary, Jean-Yves; Hohnadel, Alain; Sicard, Jacques. Hommes et Ouvrages de la Ligne Maginot, Tome 5. Paris, Histoire & Collections, 2009. ISBN 978-2-35250-127-5 (in French)
