= Ouvrage Boussois =

Military fortification in the Fortified Sector of Maubeuge

- Part of Maginot Line New Fronts, Séré de Rivières system
- Northern France
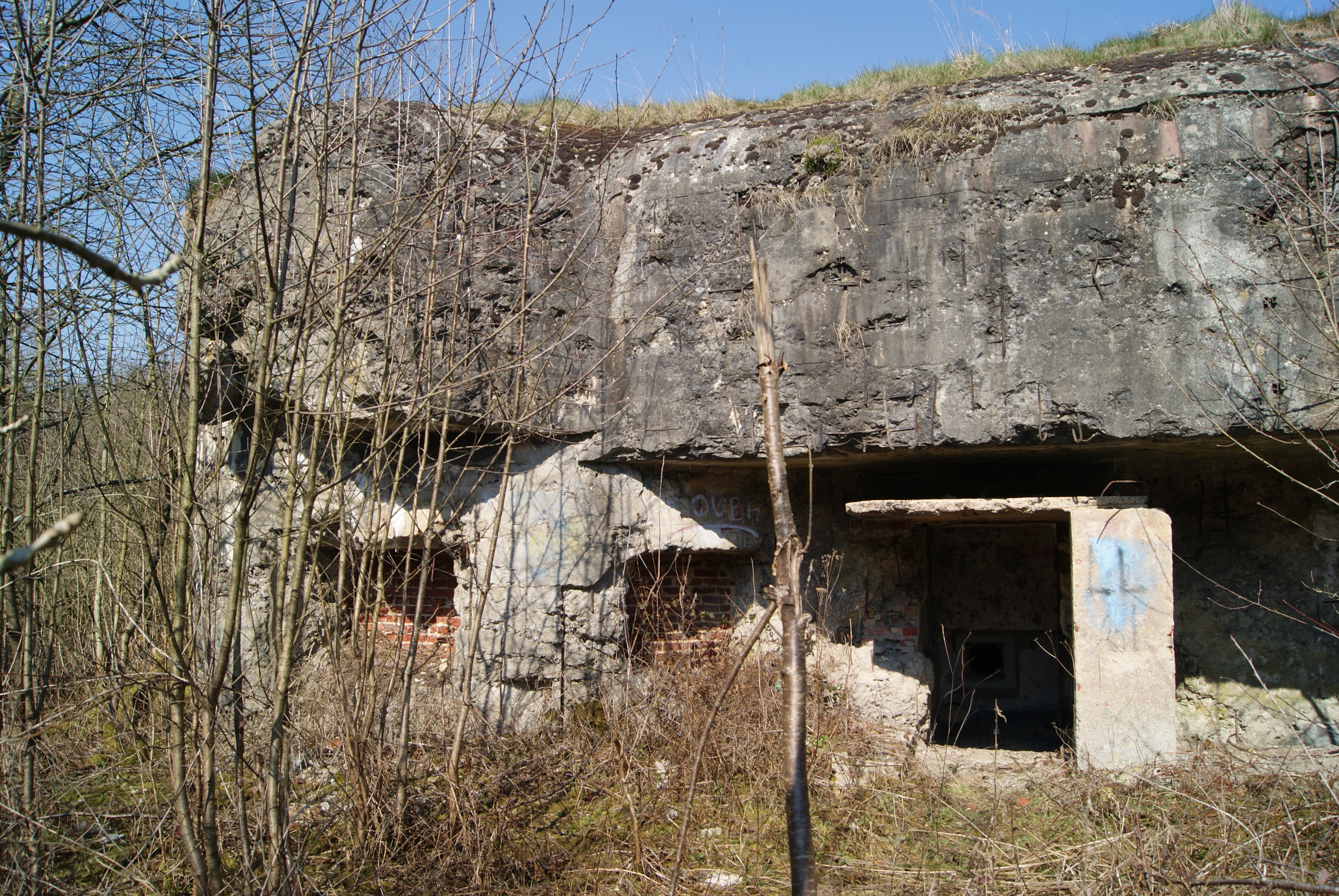
- Ouvreage Boussois

Site information
- Owner: Town of Boussois
- Controlled by: France
- Condition: Abandoned

Location
- Coordinates: 50.29628°N 4.05304°E

Site history
- Built: 1934-1938
- Materials: Concrete, steel, deep excavation
- Battles/wars: Siege of Maubeuge, Battle of France

Ouvrage Boussois is a petit ouvrage of the Maginot Line, built as part of the "New Fronts" program to address shortcomings in the Line's coverage of the border with Belgium. Like the other three ouvrages near Maubeuge, it is built on an old Séré de Rivières fortification, near the town of Boussois. The fortification surrendered to the Germans twice, in the First World War on 6 September 1914, and in the Second World War on 22 May 1940. The site is now abandoned.

== Fort de Boussois ==
The Fort de Boussois, also known as the Fort de Kilmaine, was built between 1881 and 1883 as part of the Séré de Rivières system of fortifications. It overlooks the valley of the Sambre. The pentagonal fort is surrounded by a ditch defended by caponiers and counterscarps. The fort featured a Mougin turret with two 155 mm guns. A cavalier, or elevated surface for artillery, surmounts the reinforced barracks. Underground galleries link the salients, caponiers and counterscarps to the central portions of the fort.

=== World War I ===
The Fort de Boussois came under fire in 1914 during the opening phases of World War I, during the Siege of Maubeuge. On August 31, a shell killed 60 men when it hit the powder magazine. The Mougin turret was jammed on the same day. The fortifications of Maubeuge were by then far in the rear of the German lines. The fort surrendered to the Germans on 6 September, who blew up the caponiers and the turret at the end of the month.

== Design and construction ==
The Maginot-era site was approved in 1934. Work by the contractor Caroni cost 8.26 million francs. A planned second phase was to add an artillery block and support facilities. The rise in tensions between France and Germany in the late 1930s prevented the second phase from being pursued.

== Description ==
Boussois comprises three combat blocks, featuring a new combination 25mm gun/50mm mortar turret. The ouvrage (Note: English-language sources use the French term ouvrage as the preferred term for the Maginot positions, in preference to "fort", a term usually reserved for older fortifications with passive defenses in the form of walls and ditches. The literal translation of ouvrage in the sense of a fortification in English is "work." A gros ouvrage is a large fortification with a significant artillery component, while a petit ouvrage is smaller, with lighter arms.) was built within the walls of the old Fort de Boussois. A compact underground gallery links the three blocks and contains utility spaces, barracks and magazine space. Construction was complicated by the presence of old mines beneath the fort.

- Block 1: Infantry block with one automatic rifle cloche (GFM-B), one mixed-arms cloche (AM), one twin machine gun embrasure, and one machine gun/47 mm anti-tank gun (JM/AC47) embrasure.
- Block 2: Infantry block with one GFM cloche and one retractable 25mm gun/50mm mortar mixed-arms turret.
- Block 3: Infantry block with two GFM cloches, one retractable mixed-arms turret, one twin machine gun embrasure, and one machine gun/47 mm anti-tank gun (JM/AC47) embrasure.

The second phase added two blocks with a 75mm twin gun turret each, as well as separate munitions and personnel entries well beyond the walls of the old fort.

A number of small blockhouses are associated with Bersillies, as well as a casemate:

- Casemate de l'Épinette: Double machine gun block with two JM/AC47 embrasures, two JM embrasures, one AM cloche and two GFM-B cloches. It is not connected to the ouvrage.

== Manning ==
The 1940 manning of the ouvrage under the command of Captain Bertain comprised 195 men and 5 officers of the 84th Fortress Infantry Regiment. The units were under the umbrella of the 101st Fortress Infantry Division, 1st Army, Army Group 1.

== History of the Maginot ouvrage ==
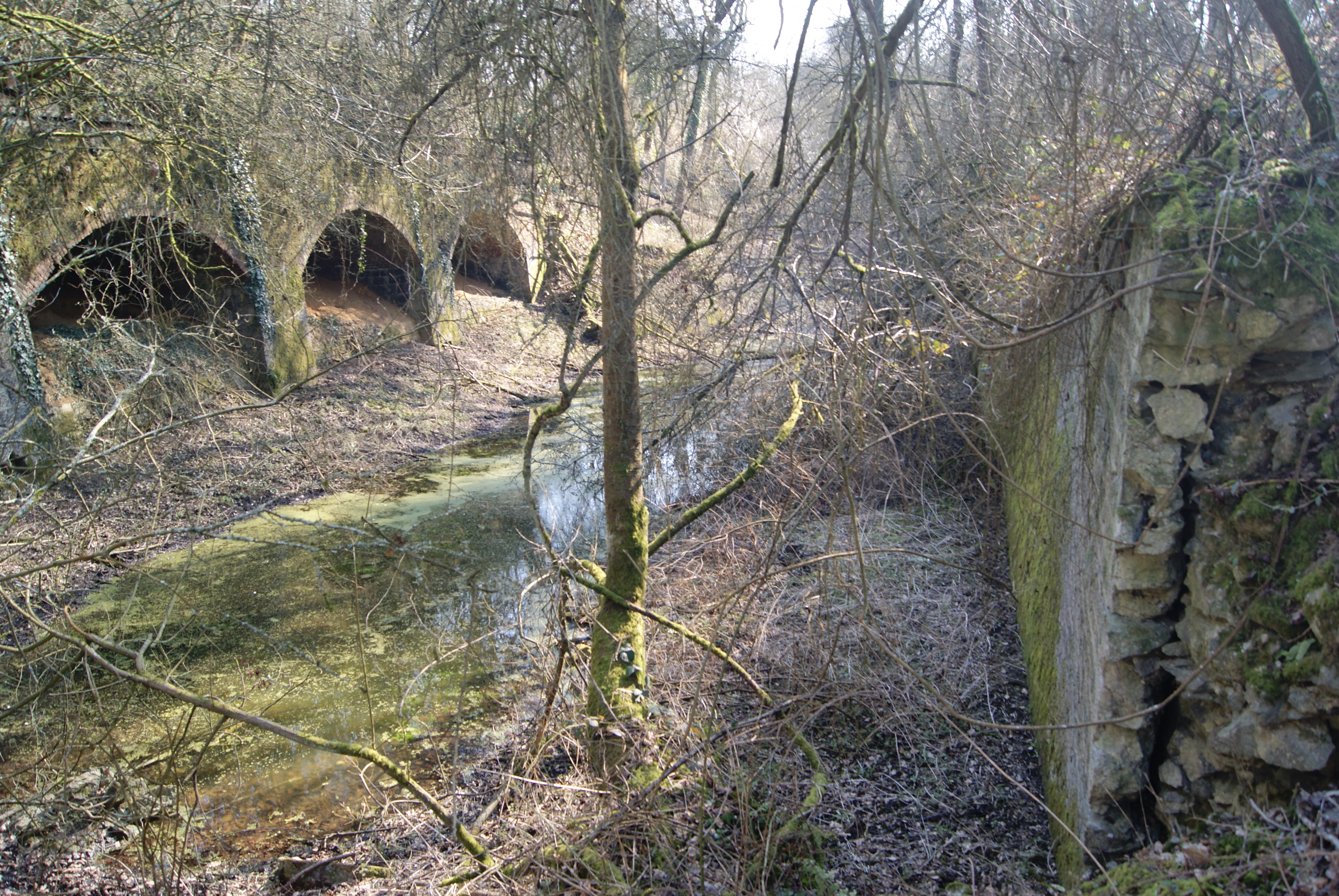
The original Fort de Boussois' ditch

See Fortified Sector of Maubeuge for a broader discussion of the events of 1940 in the Maubeuge sector of the Maginot Line.

During the Battle of France in 1940, the invading German forces approached Maubeuge from the south and east, to the rear of the defensive line. As the German 28th Infantry Division moved along the line of fortifications on 19 May they were fired upon by Boussois. The Germans replied with fire from 8.8cm and 15 cm guns, hitting blocks 1 and 3 at short range. Firing continued the next day and was extended to the other ouvrages of the sector, with aerial bombardment by Stukas. Late on the 21st an infantry attack on the ouvrage was repelled. By the next morning the ventilation system had failed, and ventilation had to be improvised using the drains and a portable fan. The turret was jammed, pointing in a useless direction. The fort finally surrendered at 1100 hours on the 22nd.

== Current condition ==
The interiors of the Maubeuge fortifications were stripped of their equipment by the Germans in 1941. The surface of the Séré de Rivières fortifications is enveloped by weeds and thorns. The Maginot fortifications are closed to access.

== See also ==
- List of all works on Maginot Line
- Siegfried Line
- Atlantic Wall
- Czechoslovak border fortifications

== Bibliography ==
- Allcorn, William. The Maginot Line 1928-45. Oxford: Osprey Publishing, 2003. ISBN 1-84176-646-1
- Kaufmann, J.E. and Kaufmann, H.W. Fortress France: The Maginot Line and French Defenses in World War II, Stackpole Books, 2006. ISBN 0-275-98345-5
- Kaufmann, J.E., Kaufmann, H.W., Jancovič-Potočnik, A. and Lang, P. The Maginot Line: History and Guide, Pen and Sword, 2011. ISBN 978-1-84884-068-3
- Mary, Jean-Yves; Hohnadel, Alain; Sicard, Jacques. Hommes et Ouvrages de la Ligne Maginot, Tome 1. Paris, Histoire & Collections, 2001. ISBN 2-908182-88-2 (in French)
- Mary, Jean-Yves; Hohnadel, Alain; Sicard, Jacques. Hommes et Ouvrages de la Ligne Maginot, Tome 2. Paris, Histoire & Collections, 2003. ISBN 2-908182-97-1 (in French)
- Mary, Jean-Yves; Hohnadel, Alain; Sicard, Jacques. Hommes et Ouvrages de la Ligne Maginot, Tome 3. Paris, Histoire & Collections, 2003. ISBN 2-913903-88-6 (in French)
- Mary, Jean-Yves; Hohnadel, Alain; Sicard, Jacques. Hommes et Ouvrages de la Ligne Maginot, Tome 5. Paris, Histoire & Collections, 2009. ISBN 978-2-35250-127-5 (in French)
