= Séré de Rivières system =

Fortifications in France

- Part of frontier and coast defences
- France
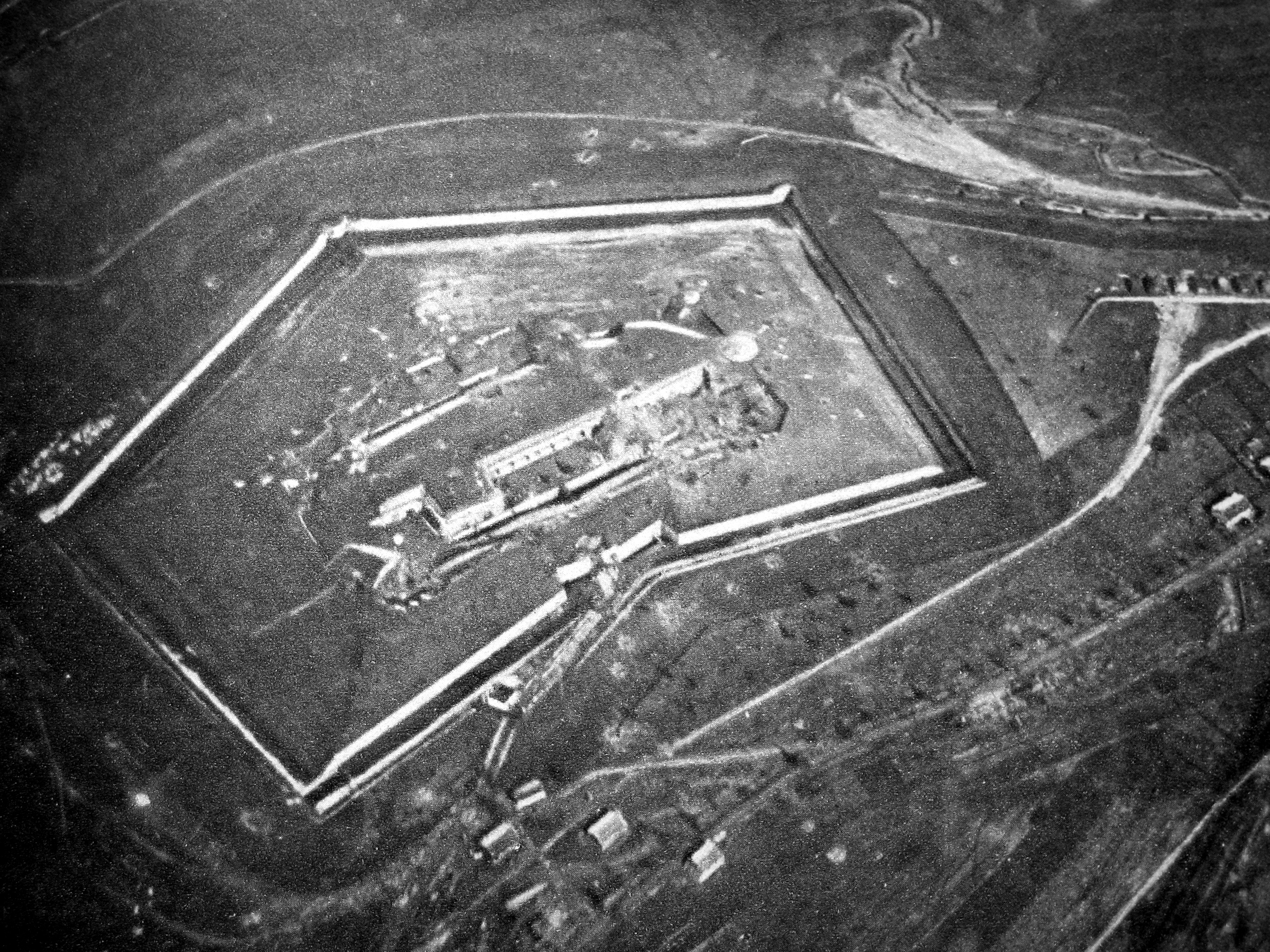
- Aerial photograph of Fort de Douaumont, Verdun, 1916

Site information
- Owner: French Third Republic (La Troisième République)
- Operator: Comité de Défense 1872–1888; Conseil Supérieur de la Guerre 1888–1918

Location
- Coordinates: 46°00′N 02°00′E

Site history
- Built: 1874
- Built by: Service du Génie (Military Engineers) Raymond Adolphe Séré de Rivières
- In use: 1918
- Materials: Stone, concrete and steel
- Battles/wars: First World War; Battle of the Frontiers; Battle of Verdun

Garrison information
- Occupants: French Army

The Séré de Rivières system was an ensemble of fortifications built from 1874 along the frontiers, ridges and coasts of France. The fortifications were named after their architect, Brigadier-General Raymond Adolphe Séré de Rivières. The fortresses were obsolescent by 1914 but were used during the First World War.

== Background ==
=== Comité de défense ===
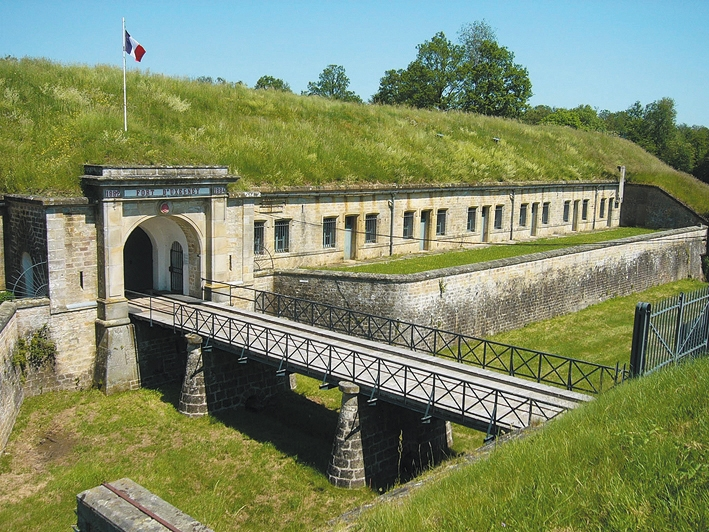
Entry, Fort d'Uxegney

Following the Franco-Prussian War of 1870–1871, France found itself seriously weakened and isolated from the rest of Europe, menaced by Germany and stung by the loss of Alsace-Lorraine. At the same time as the departure of the last German troops, France created the Defence Committee (Comité de défense), which was active between 1872 and 1888, whose mission was to reorganize the defence of the French frontiers and coasts. It was necessary to compensate for the lost territories of the north-east; to modernise old fortifications, which had been shown to be wanting in the last war and to create new fortifications proof against modern weaponry using new and more powerful explosives.

The committee was created by a presidential decree on 28 July 1872, with nine members from the Ministry of War and representatives from artillery and military engineering. General Séré de Rivières, commander of engineering for the Second Army Corps of Versailles, was named secretary of the committee in 1873 and on 1 February 1874, he was promoted to Chief of Engineers. Séré de Rivières was re-elected head of the committee several times, with all powers necessary to realize his ideas without opposition. The first works of the new French fortification system were begun in 1874. In 1880, when the work was already quite advanced and after some internal rivalries and political machinations, General Séré de Rivières was removed from the Comité de défense but the work continued.

=== 1874 fortifications ===
Since the fortifications executed by Vauban in the 17th century, defensive technology had not evolved during the 19th century. During the Franco-Prussian War, their shortcomings became clear and that the "impregnable citadel" could no longer resist assault. It was necessary to rethink strong points and adapt them to the vast increase in the destructiveness of artillery. Gone were citadels surrounding towns. Forts were to be moved some 12 km (7.5 mi) outside cities to keep an opponent beyond artillery range of the city centre. Rings of forts were to be built, spaced to allow them to cover the intervals in between. The new forts abandoned the principle of the bastion, which had also been made obsolete by advances in armaments. The outline was a simplified polygon, surrounded by a ditch that was covered by caponiers. The forts, built in masonry and shaped stone, were designed to shelter their garrison against bombardment and artillery was laid out on top of the fort in the open. A feature of the new system involved the construction of two defensive curtains, an outer line of forts, backed by an inner ring or line of forts d’arrêt at vital points of terrain or junctions, along with a great number of coastal batteries. Examples of the first sort may be found at Verdun, Toul, Épinal, Belfort in the north-east as well as Paris and Brest. Forts d'arrêts may be found at Manonviller, (Meurthe-et-Moselle) and Bourlémont (Vosges).

=== Explosive shell crisis ===
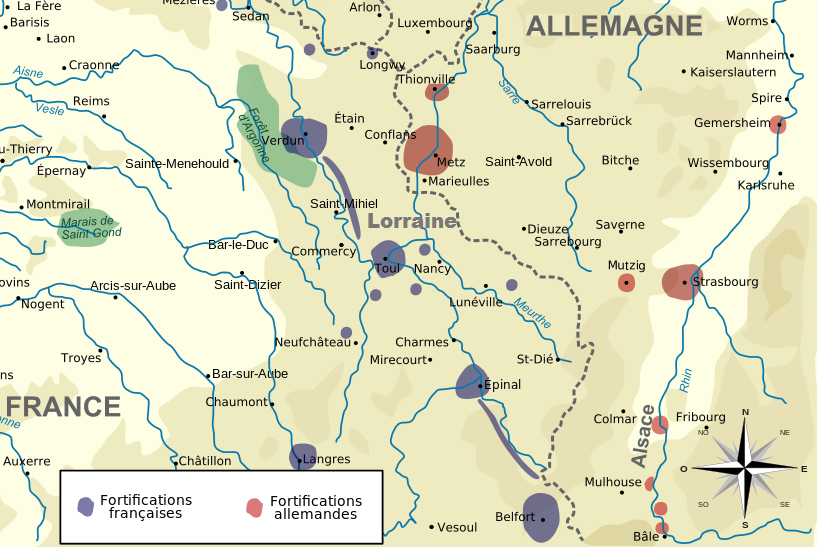
Map of the southern portion of the system, 1914

From 1883 to 1885, a revolution occurred in artillery, with the introduction of new materials and techniques, notably the introduction of breech-loading, rifled artillery and much more powerful explosives, such as picric acid. The developments multiplied the power of artillery against fortifications. Tests against Fort Malmaison, south of Laon, in 1886 indicated that masonry forts had little resistance to the new ammunition and that the artillery on their superstructures was extremely vulnerable. High-strength concrete was more resistant than masonry to explosives. The development of reinforced concrete would make the new fortifications much more resistant to the new explosives. Forts already in use were a large proportion of the system and some of the forts were downgraded and others were covered in concrete which buried vulnerable portions, such as magazines, behind the new material.

== New technology ==
=== Armour ===
Advances in the iron and steel industries allowed the new forts to use armour in new ways. In 1875, the Mougin system of laminated armour, using rolled iron, was first used in casemates to provide protection against field guns. Rolled iron gave way to cast iron, providing protection against heavier siege guns. Mougin also devised the Mougin turret, a revolving cast iron turret for 155 mm (6.1 in) guns. Cast iron was not altogether suitable for protection against explosive shells and it was superseded in 1882. In 1885, steel was substituted for cast iron. Non-retractable or non-eclipsing turrets could avoid direct-fire damage to their gun embrasures only by facing away from the direction of fire. Eclipsing turrets were developed that were retractable, leaving only their top surfaces exposed. Such turrets were expensive and complex, with serious problems of noise and ventilation but were shown to be effective. Casemated artillery was used as much as possible, due to the lower cost. While heavy armament was being armoured, lighter armament and observers were also protected. A range of armoured machine gun and observation positions were developed and were widely installed.

=== Organization ===
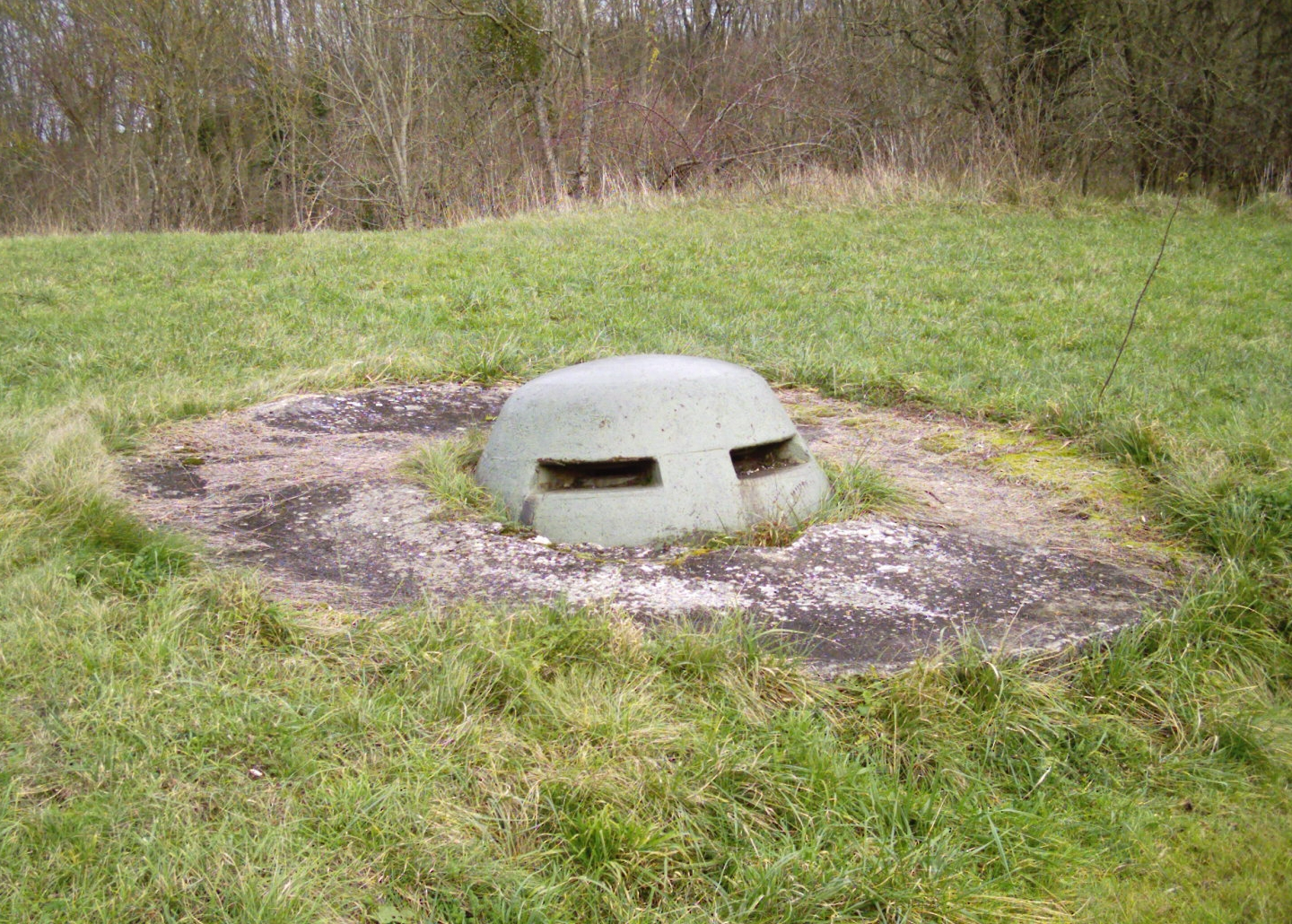
Armoured observatory (Fort de Villey-le-Sec).

The Séré de Rivières system involved fortified towns and defensive screens. The towns were intended to furnish locations for eventual counter-attack, while the defensive curtain prevented passage by an attacker. The screen was not continuous and was arranged to channel an attack to a secondary line of fortified towns. Other systems were intended to delay the progress of an attack to build up defensive forces. A typical defended point consisted of a circle of forts around a town about 10 km (6.2 mi) from the centre. The forts were able to provide mutual support and could fire on one another to suppress attacks. Smaller works were provided to support the infantry in the intervals between forts, which provided shelter to infantry during bombardment and some contained reserve artillery. A supply network of 60 cm (24 in) railways extended behind the lines. Known as the Péchot system; it was first installed at Toul and was generally adopted in 1888.

=== Forts ===
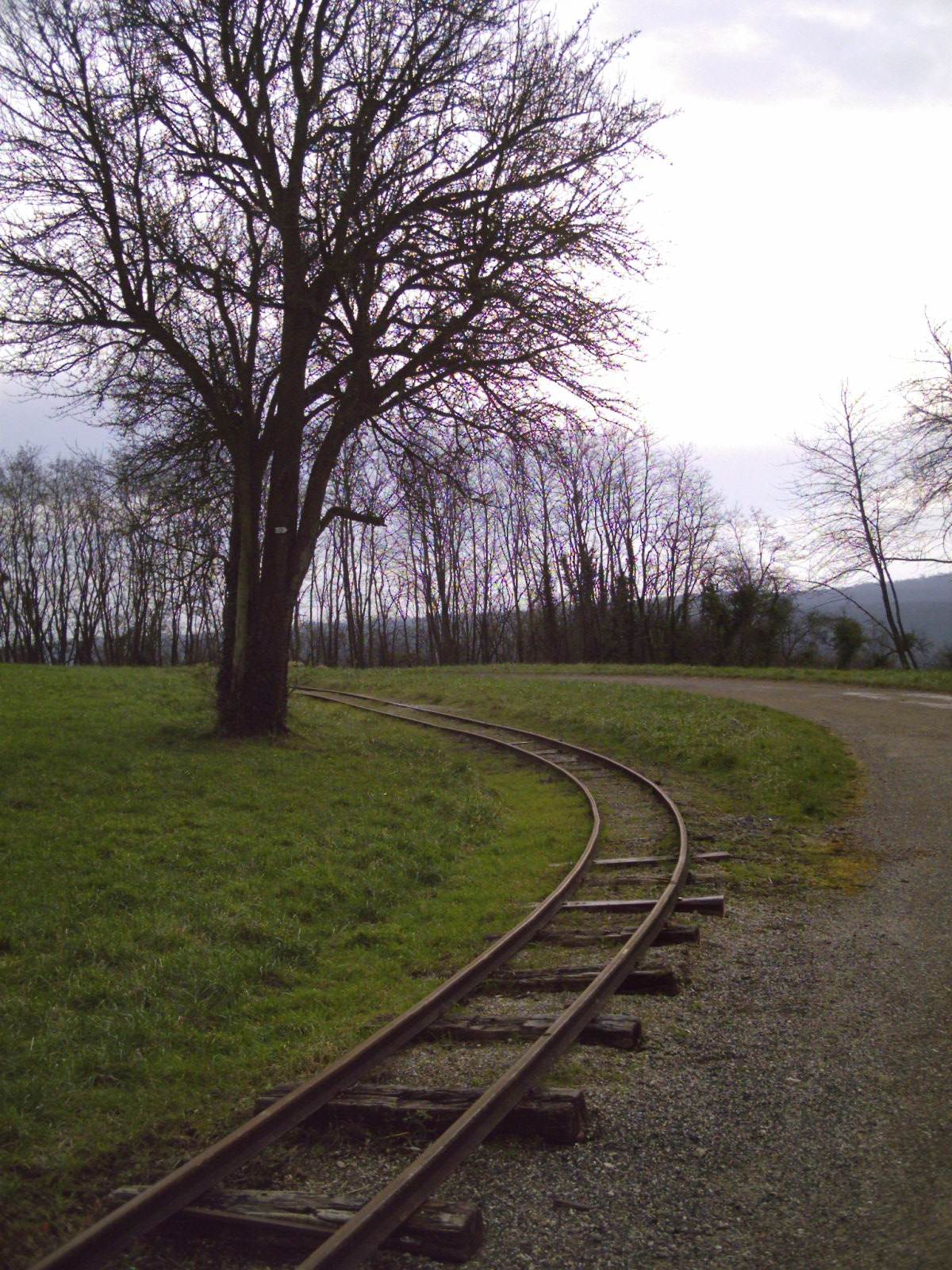
Military railroad at the Fort de Villey-le-Sec.

Three types of fort were built, stop forts, screening forts and point defence forts; the forts may be further categorized by their state of modernization. Stop forts were intended to be autonomous, capable of functioning if isolated from the rest of the system and assure their own defence. Such forts could fire in all directions. Screening forts were intended to lend mutual support to others of their kind and generally defended on one front. Their artillery focused on specific areas of control.

==== First generation forts ====
Prior to modernization, these forts were built entirely of masonry, using large quantities of shaped stone. The forts were provided with a ditch, 6–12 m (20–39 ft) wide and bounded by the main wall of the fort on one side and a counterscarp on the opposing side. Moats were unusual features in the Séré de Rivières system; most ditches were dry. Some walls were crenelated for defence and many had caponiers at angles to fire along the length of the ditch. Entry was typically by drawbridge. Inside the fort perimeter were multi-story barracks with facades facing interior courtyards. Barracks were typically semi-recessed into the walls and included mess halls, kitchens and cisterns. Powder magazines were buried for protection from artillery, located behind triple-locked double doors and illuminated indirectly from lamp rooms to prevent accidental explosion. The artillery was laid out on top of the ramparts; shelters were provided for ready ammunition. In some cases, artillery was in armoured casemates or Mougin turrets. Special infantry positions were provided for defence of the ditch.

==== Modernized forts ====
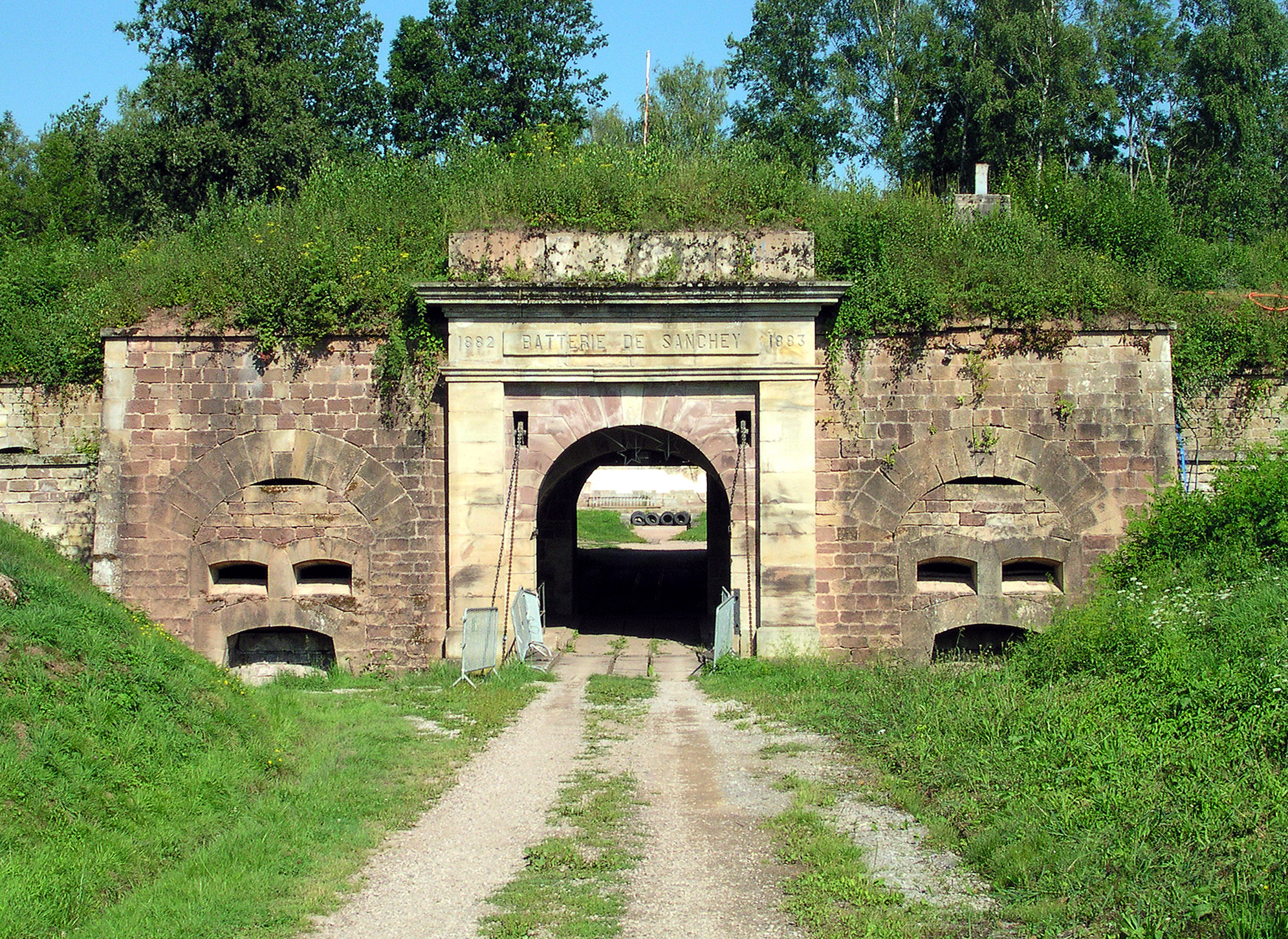
Entry to Battery Sanchey, near Épinal

After the rise of the explosive shell the most important forts were modernised. A covering of concrete was placed over the masonry to protect against the new artillery. In some cases, concrete casemates were built, leaving the stone casemates alone. The most vulnerable locations in the fort were the magazines, which in the modernised forts were dispersed and more deeply buried. Protected paths were created along the ramparts, along with protected sally ports giving on to the ditch and galleries within the counterscarps looking back at the fort. Artillery was removed from the ramparts and placed under shelter of concrete. Fewer new guns was as effective as the former batteries. Eclipsing infantry positions and observation cloches were also provided. The newest forts of this time were given central electrical plants.

==== Forts after 1885 ====
These forts were built in concrete from the beginning but due to budget cuts were smaller than previous forts.

=== Wartime improvisation ===
During the Battle of Verdun the troops, under bombardment and fearing for the concrete fort, excavated new galleries under the fort for shelter and living quarters. Some of these galleries connected neighbouring fortifications, foreshadowing the connected systems of the Maginot Line. The travaux de 17 (built in 1917) also foreshadowed this advance.

== See also ==
- Fortification (general)
- List of fortifications
- Ceintures de Lyon
- Douaumont
- Verdun
- Fortifications of Paris in the 19th and 20th centuries
