= Fort d'Embourg =

19th-20th century defence for Liège, Belgium

- Part of Fortified Position of Liège
- Embourg, Belgium
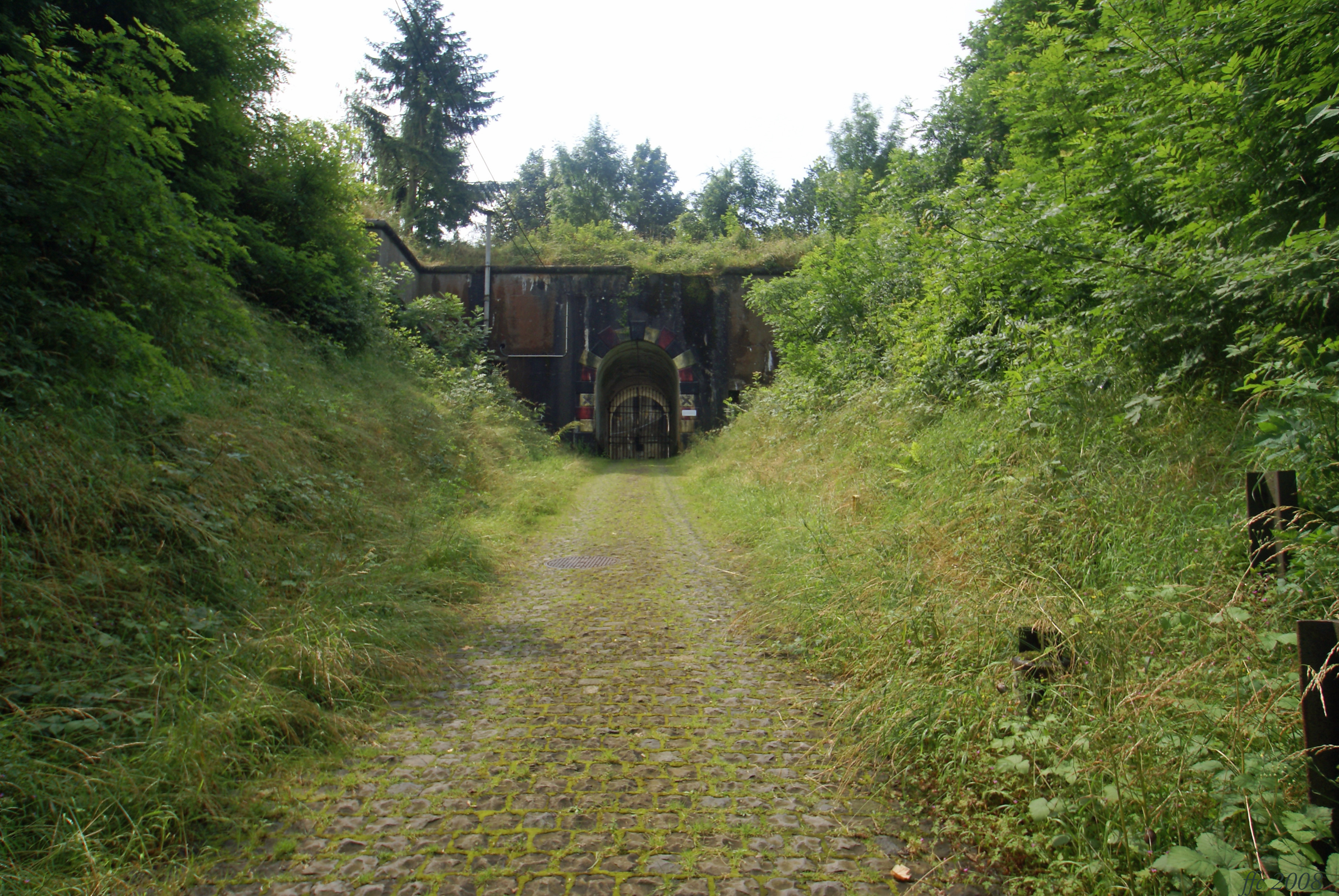
- Entry to Embourg

Site information
- Type: Fort
- Controlled by: Belgium
- Open to the public: Yes
- Condition: Preserved

Location
- Location within Belgium
- Coordinates: 50°34′54″N 5°37′05″E

Site history
- Built: 1881
- Materials: Unreinforced concrete
- Battles/wars: Battle of Liège, Battle of Belgium

The Fort d'Embourg (French pronunciation: [fɔʁ dɑ̃buʁ]) is one of twelve forts built around Liège, Belgium, in the late 19th century. The overall Fortified Position of Liège was a constituent part of the country's National Redoubt. Fort d'Embourg was built between 1881 and 1884 according to the plans of General Henri Alexis Brialmont. Contrasting with the French forts built in the same era by Raymond Adolphe Séré de Rivières, the fort was built exclusively of unreinforced concrete, a new material, rather than masonry. The fort was heavily bombarded by German artillery in the Battle of Liège in World War I and again at the opening of World War II. It has been preserved and is operated as a museum.

== Description ==
The Fort d'Embourg is located about 7 kilometres (4.3 mi) southeast of the center of Liège, on the heights above the community of Chaudfontaine, overlooking the Vesdre valley.

The fort was built as an irregular rectangle, in contrast to most Brialmont forts, which were triangular. A 6-metre (20 ft) deep by 8-metre (26 ft) ditch encircles the fort. The principal armament was concentrated in the central massif. The ditches were defended in enfilade by 57 mm guns in casemates resembling counterscarp batteries, firing at shot traps at the other end of the ditch. The fort is one of the smallest Liège forts. Embourg is more elevated above the surrounding country than most of the Liège forts, overlooking the Ourthe and Vesdre valleys and controlling the road from Liège to Spa.

With the exception of the Fort de Loncin, the Belgian forts made little provision for the daily needs of their wartime garrisons, locating latrines, showers, kitchens and the morgue in the fort's counterscarp, a location that would be untenable in combat. This would have profound effects on the forts' ability to endure a long assault. The service areas were placed directly opposite the barracks, which opened into the ditch in the rear of the fort (i.e., in the face towards Liège), with lesser protection than the two "salient" sides. The Brialmont forts placed a weaker side to the rear to allow for recapture by Belgian forces from the rear, and located the barracks and support facilities on this side, using the rear ditch for light and ventilation of living spaces. In combat heavy shellfire made the rear ditch untenable, and German forces were able to get between the forts and attack them from the rear.

The Brialmont forts were designed to be protected from shellfire equaling their heaviest guns: 21 cm. The top of the central massif used 4 metres (13 ft) of unreinforced concrete, while the caserne walls, judged to be less exposed, used 1.5 metres (4.9 ft). Under fire, the forts were damaged by 21 cm fire and could not withstand heavier artillery.

== Armament ==
Embourg's armament included a Grüsonwerke turret with a single 21 cm Krupp gun, a 15 cm Creusot turret with twin guns and a 12 cm Châtillon-Commentry turret with two Krupp guns, all for distant targets. Four Grüsonwerke 57 mm gun turrets were provided for local defense. The fort also mounted an observation turret with a searchlight. Nine rapid-fire 57 mm guns were provided in casemates for the defense of the ditches and the postern.

The fort's heavy guns were German, typically Krupp, while the turret mechanisms were from a variety of sources. The fort was provided with signal lights to permit communication with the neighboring Fort de Loncin and Fort de Liers. The guns were fired using black powder rather than smokeless powder, producing choking gas in the confined firing spaces that spread throughout the fort.

== First World War ==
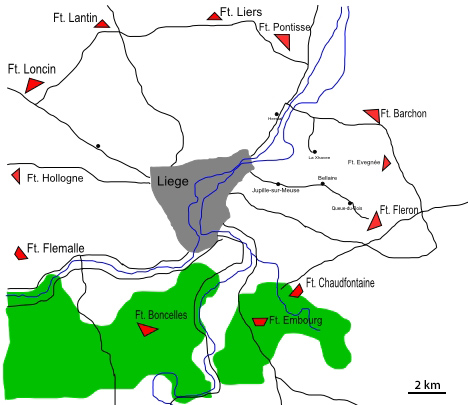
The Liège forts

Liège first came under attack on 6 August 1914. When Liège's fortifications proved unexpectedly stubborn, the Germans brought heavy siege artillery to bombard the forts with shells far larger than they were designed to resist. Embourg was heavily bombarded starting 12 August. The fort surrendered the next day after 48 hours of bombardment.

Occupying the fort during the remainder of the war, Germans made a number of improvements to the fort in 1914 and 1915.

== Fortified Position of Liège ==
Embourg's armament was upgraded in the 1930s to become part of the Fortified Position of Liège II, which was planned to deter a German incursion over the nearby border. The armament was upgraded with new guns in the turrets and an anti-aircraft battery. This was accompanied by improvements to ventilation, protection, sanitary facilities, communications and electrical power. An infantry shelter with an automatic rifle cloche was built at this time, as well as a remote air intake tower some distance to the west of the fort, linked to the fort by a tunnel. In 1940 the fort's garrison comprised 323 men, mostly reservists, with four officers.

== Second World War ==
Embourg first came into contact with German forces during the Battle of Belgium on 12 May 1940. The fort was surrounded on the 13th, occupying areas around the rear of the fort including the air intake tower. The neighboring Chaudfontaine provided supporting fire against German infantry, who mounted an infantry attack at 10 p.m.. On the 14th the Germans continued artillery fire against Embourg while Embourg fired in support of Chaudfontaine. On the 15th, aerial bombardment started at 2 p.m., lasting until the night. The next day the aerial bombardment resumed while German units infiltrated the area around the fort . On the 17th the fort was attack by bombers, artillery and infantry. Embourg called for artillery support from surrounding forts, which they could not provide, but did provide support for a while to Chaudfontaine. Shortly thereafter the 75mm gun turrets were knocked out of action. After sabotaging the fort's equipment, the garrison surrendered.

== Present ==
A commemorative association was established in 1946, which has erected monuments and maintained a museum in the fort. The fort has been preserved and may be visited by the public.

== Bibliography ==
- Donnell, Clayton, The Forts of the Meuse in World War I, Osprey Publishing, Oxford, 2007, ISBN 978-1-84603-114-4.
- Kauffmann, J.E., Jurga, R., Fortress Europe: European Fortifications of World War II, Da Capo Press, USA, 2002, ISBN 0-306-81174-X.
