= Fort de Chaudfontaine =

19th-20th century defence for Liège, Belgium

- Part of Fortified Position of Liège
- Chaudfontaine, Belgium
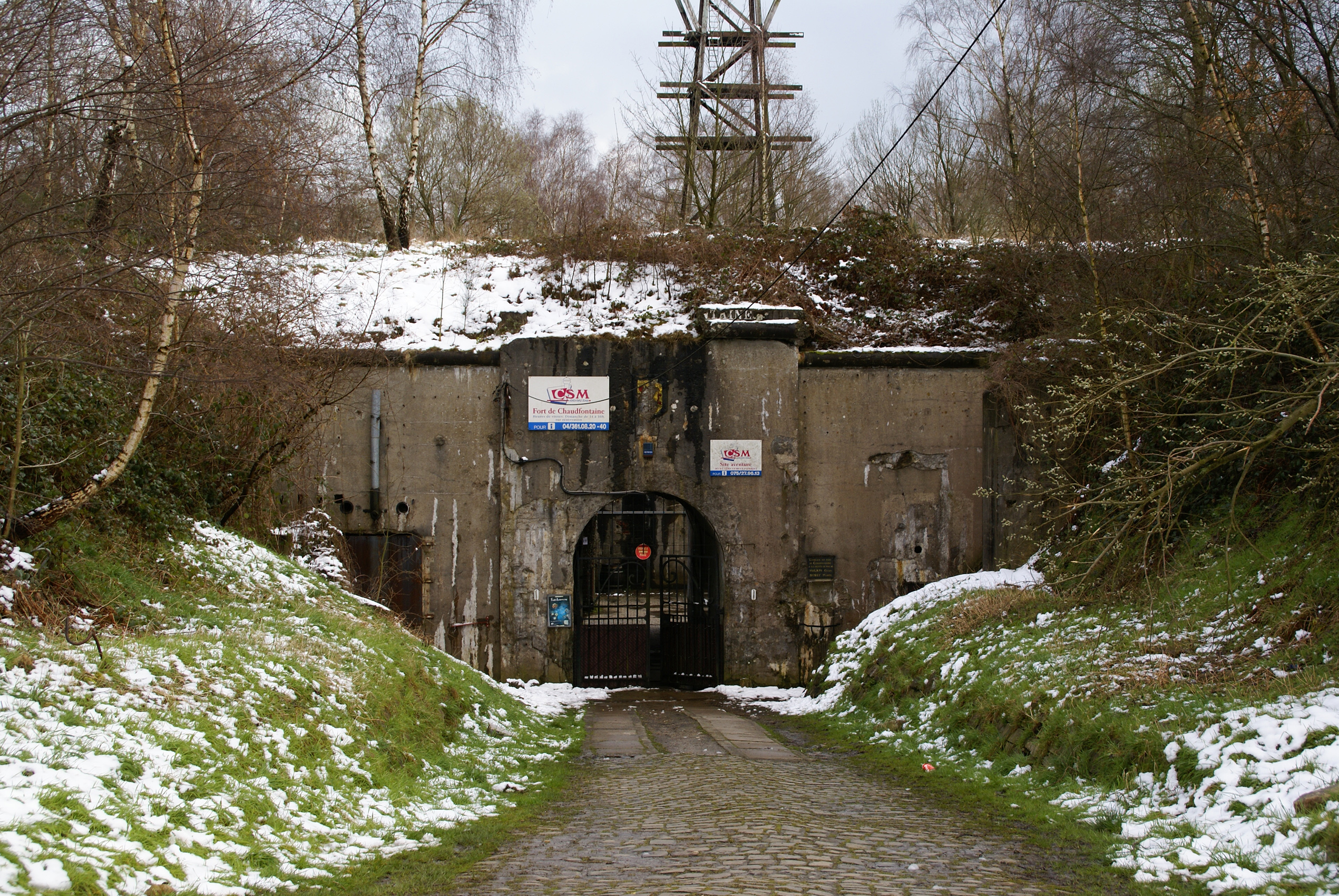
- Entry to Chaudfontaine

Site information
- Type: Fort
- Controlled by: Belgium
- Open to the public: Yes
- Condition: Preserved

Location
- Coordinates: 50.59101°N 5.64132°E

Site history
- Built: 1881
- Materials: Unreinforced concrete
- Battles/wars: Battle of Liège, Battle of Belgium

The Fort de Chaudfontaine (French pronunciation: [fɔʁ də ʃofɔ̃tɛn]) is one of twelve forts built around Liège, Belgium, in the late 19th century. The overall Fortified Position of Liège was a constituent part of the country's National Redoubt. Fort de Chaudfontaine was built between 1881 and 1884 according to the plans of General Henri Alexis Brialmont. Contrasting with the French forts built in the same era by Raymond Adolphe Séré de Rivières, the fort was built exclusively of unreinforced concrete, a new material, rather than masonry. The fort was heavily bombarded by German artillery in the Battle of Liège. The fort is now used as an adventure park.

== Description ==
The Fort de Chaudfontaine is located about 7 kilometres (4.3 mi) southeast of the center of Liège, on the heights above the community of Chaudfontaine, overlooking the Vesdre valley.

The fort was built as an irregular rectangle, in contrast to most Brialmont forts, which were triangular. A 6-metre (20 ft) deep by 8-metre (26 ft) ditch encircles the fort. The principal armament was concentrated in the central massif. The ditches were defended in enfilade by 57 mm guns in casemates resembling counterscarp batteries, firing at shot traps at the other end of the ditch. The fort is one of the smaller Liège forts.

With the exception of the Fort de Loncin, the Belgian forts made little provision for the daily needs of their wartime garrisons, locating latrines, showers, kitchens and the morgue in the fort's counterscarp, a location that would be untenable in combat. This would have profound effects on the forts' ability to endure a long assault. The service areas were placed directly opposite the barracks, which opened into the ditch in the rear of the fort (i.e., in the face towards Liège), with lesser protection than the two "salient" sides. The Brialmont forts placed a weaker side to the rear to allow for recapture by Belgian forces from the rear, and located the barracks and support facilities on this side, using the rear ditch for light and ventilation of living spaces. In combat heavy shellfire made the rear ditch untenable, and German forces were able to get between the forts and attack them from the rear.

The Brialmont forts were designed to be protected from shellfire equaling their heaviest guns: 21 cm. The top of the central massif used 4 metres (13 ft) of unreinforced concrete, while the caserne walls, judged to be less exposed, used 1.5 metres (4.9 ft). Under fire, the forts were damaged by 21 cm fire and could not withstand heavier artillery.

== Armament ==
Chaudfontaine's armament included a Grusonwerke turret with a single 21 cm Krupp gun, a 15 cm Creusot turret with twin guns and a 12 cm Châtillon-Commentry turret with two Krupp guns, all for distant targets. Four Grusonwerke 57 mm gun turrets were provided for local defense. The fort also mounted an observation turret with a searchlight. Nine rapid-fire 57 mm guns were provided in casemates for the defense of the ditches and the postern.

The fort's heavy guns were German, typically Krupp, while the turret mechanisms were from a variety of sources. The fort was provided with signal lights to permit communication with the neighboring Fort de Loncin and Fort de Liers. The guns were fired using black powder rather than smokeless powder, producing choking gas in the confined firing spaces that spread throughout the fort.

== First World War ==
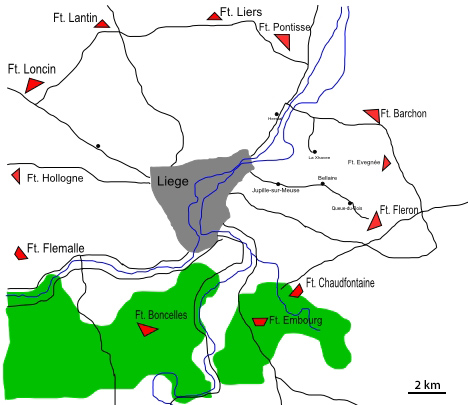
The Liège forts

Liège first came under attack on 6 August 1914. When the Liège's fortifications proved unexpectedly stubborn, the Germans brought heavy siege artillery to bombard the forts with shells far larger than they were designed to resist. Chaudfontaine was heavily bombarded starting 12 August, with firing rates of 200 to 300 shells per hour. On 13 August a shell hit the 21 cm turret, causing an explosion in the turret. The explosion, fire and the resulting toxic fumes killed at least 58 of the garrison. (Note: Donnell mentions 97 killed immediately and 30 mortally wounded.) With the interior atmosphere unbreathable, the fort surrendered that day.

Occupying the fort during the remainder of the war, Germans made a number of improvements to the fort in 1914 and 1915.

== Fortified Position of Liège ==
Chaudfontaine's armament was upgraded in the 1930s to become part of the Fortified Position of Liège II, which was planned to deter a German incursion over the nearby border. The armament was upgraded with new guns in the turrets. This was accompanied by improvements to ventilation, protection, sanitary facilities, communications and electrical power. An air intake tower was added overlooking the Vesdre. New barracks were built at this time for peacetime accommodation. A large infantry shelter was constructed on the fort's glacis, intended to be linked to the main fort.

== Second World War ==
Chaudfontaine came under attack during the Battle of Belgium on 16 May 1940. It was bombarded by the Luftwaffe in the early hours of the 17th, setting off explosions within the fort. A German attack in the daytime resulted in casualties among the garrison, and at 1930 hours the fort surrendered.

== Present ==
The fort de Chaudfontaine is occupied by an adventure park. A small cemetery and war memorial are located just outside the main gate, containing the bodies of the 71 killed in 1914, including two from the Fort de Fléron, ten killed in the interval between the forts, and a civilian who was executed at Romsée.

== Bibliography ==
- Donnell, Clayton, The Forts of the Meuse in World War I, Osprey Publishing, Oxford, 2007, ISBN 978-1-84603-114-4.
- Kauffmann, J.E., Jurga, R., Fortress Europe: European Fortifications of World War II, Da Capo Press, USA, 2002, ISBN 0-306-81174-X.
