= Fort de Lantin =

19th-20th century defence for Liège, Belgium

- Part of Fortified Position of Liège
- Lantin, Belgium
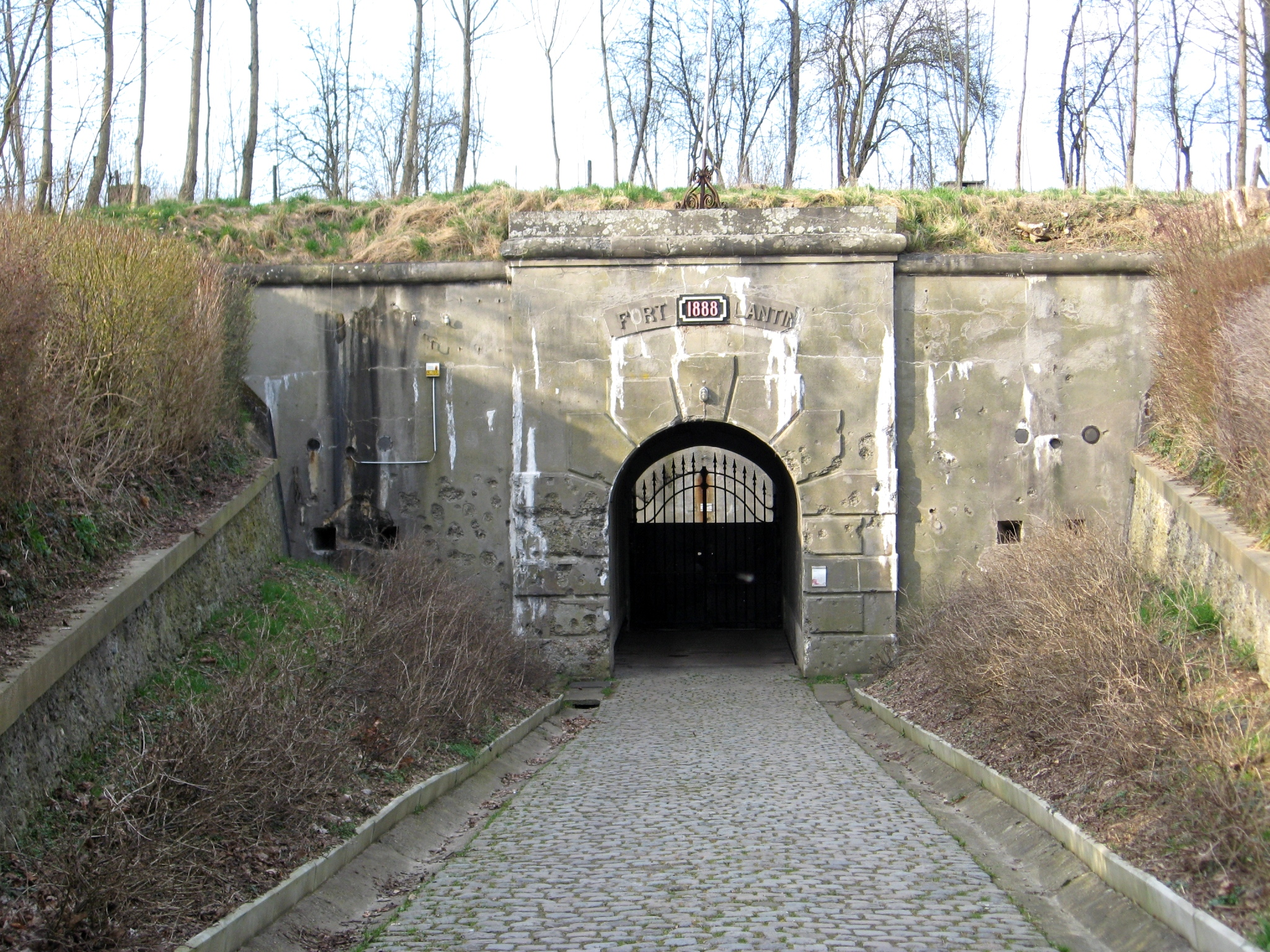
- Fort de Lantin entry

Site information
- Type: Fort
- Owner: Amis du Fort de Lantin
- Controlled by: Belgium
- Open to the public: Yes
- Condition: Preserved

Location
- Coordinates: 50.69463°N 5.52577°E

Site history
- Built: 1881
- Materials: Unreinforced concrete
- Battles/wars: Battle of Liège

The Fort de Lantin (French pronunciation: [fɔʁ də lɑ̃tɛ̃]) is one of twelve forts built around Liège, Belgium, in the late 19th century. The overall Fortified Position of Liège was a constituent part of the country's National Redoubt. Fort de Lantin was built between 1881 and 1884 according to the plans of General Henri Alexis Brialmont. Contrasting with the French forts built in the same era by Raymond Adolphe Séré de Rivières, the fort was built exclusively of unreinforced concrete, a new material, rather than masonry. The fort was heavily bombarded by German artillery in the Battle of Liège. Lantin was never upgraded like the other forts of Liège and retains its character as a Brialmont fort. It is preserved as a museum and may be visited by the public.

== Description ==
The Fort de Lantin is located about 7 kilometres (4.3 mi) northwest of the center of Liège.

The fort forms an isosceles triangle whose base is 200 metres (660 ft) long and whose sides measure 225 metres (738 ft). A 6-metre (20 ft) deep by 8-metre (26 ft) ditch encircles the fort. The principal armament was concentrated in the central massif. The ditches were defended in enfilade by 57 mm guns in casemates resembling counterscarp batteries, firing at shot traps at the other end of the ditch. It is one of the smaller forts of Liège.

With the exception of the Fort de Loncin, the Belgian forts made little provision for the daily needs of their wartime garrisons, locating latrines, showers, kitchens and the morgue in the fort's counterscarp, a location that would be untenable in combat. This would have profound effects on the forts' ability to endure a long assault. The service areas were placed directly opposite the barracks, which opened into the ditch in the rear of the fort (i.e., in the face towards Liège), with lesser protection than the two "salient" sides. The Brialmont forts placed a weaker side to the rear to allow for recapture by Belgian forces from the rear, and located the barracks and support facilities on this side, using the rear ditch for light and ventilation of living spaces. In combat heavy shellfire made the rear ditch untenable, and German forces were able to get between the forts and attack them from the rear.

The Brialmont forts were designed to be protected from shellfire equaling their heaviest guns: 21 cm. The top of the central massif used 4 metres (13 ft) of unreinforced concrete, while the caserne walls, judged to be less exposed, used 1.5 metres (4.9 ft). Under fire, the forts were damaged by 21 cm fire and could not withstand heavier artillery.

== Armament ==
Lantin's armament included two double 15 cm gun turrets, two double 12 cm gun turrets and 57 mm gun turrets. It also mounted an observation turret with a searchlight. Rapid-fire 57 mm guns were provided in casemates for the defense of the ditches and the postern.

The large weapons were all German products, made by Krupp in Essen, but the armor was by Cockerill (Belgium), Ateliers de Creusot (France) or Grüson (Germany). The fort was provided with signal lights to permit communication with the neighboring Fort de Loncin and Fort de Liers. The guns were fired using black powder rather than smokeless powder, producing choking gas in the confined firing spaces, that spread throughout the fort.

== First World War ==
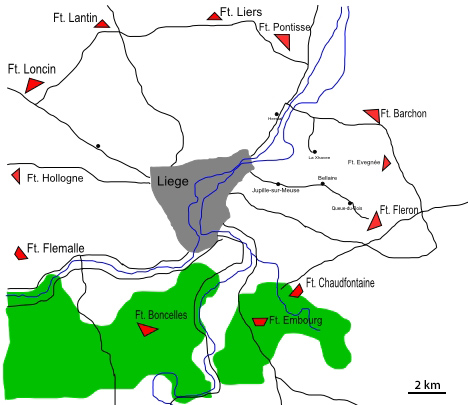
The Liège forts

In 1914 the Fort de Lantin was one of the last Liège forts to suffer German bombardment. Liège first came under attack on 6 August 1914. When the Liège proved unexpectedly stubborn, the Germans brought heavy siege artillery to bombard the forts with shells far larger than they were designed to resist. Lantin was heavily bombarded starting 10 August. It surrendered the next day, due to the asphyxiating atmosphere within.

== Present ==
Lantin was not upgraded in the 1930s as part of the Fortified Position of Liège, remaining essentially as it was built by Brialmont. The fort was acquired by the preservation organization Les Amis du Fort de Lantin from the Ministry of Defense in 1983, and is open for public tours at stated times.

== See also ==
- Fort de Loncin, a neighboring fort that exploded under bombardment on 15 August 1914 and is now a war cemetery and memorial.

== Bibliography ==
- Donnell, Clayton, The Forts of the Meuse in World War I, Osprey Publishing, Oxford, 2007, ISBN 978-1-84603-114-4.
- Kauffmann, J.E., Jurga, R., Fortress Europe: European Fortifications of World War II, Da Capo Press, USA, 2002, ISBN 0-306-81174-X.
