= Fort de Pontisse =

19th-20th century defence for Liège, Belgium

- Part of Fortified Position of Liège
- Oupeye, Belgium

Site information
- Type: Fort
- Controlled by: Belgium
- Open to the public: By appointment in summer
- Condition: Bat refuge

Location
- Coordinates: 50.69283°N 5.64038°E

Site history
- Built: 1881
- Materials: Unreinforced concrete
- Battles/wars: Battle of Liège, Battle of Belgium

The Fort de Pontisse (French pronunciation: [fɔʁ də pɔ̃tis]) is one of twelve forts built around Liège, Belgium, in the late 19th century. The overall Fortified Position of Liège was a constituent part of the country's National Redoubt. Fort de Pontisse was built between 1881 and 1884 according to the plans of General Henri Alexis Brialmont. Contrasting with the French forts built in the same era by Raymond Adolphe Séré de Rivières, the fort was built exclusively of unreinforced concrete, a new material, rather than masonry. The fort was heavily bombarded by German artillery in the Battle of Liège. Attacked in both World War I and World War II, the fort has been preserved as a refuge for bats, which may be visited during summer months.

== Description ==
The Fort de Pontisse is located about 7 kilometres (4.3 mi) northeast of the center of Liège. Flémalle overlooks the Meuse valley and the Albert Canal downstream from Liège.

The fort was built as an irregular trapezoid. A 6-metre (20 ft) deep by 8-metre (26 ft) ditch encircles the fort. The principal armament was concentrated in the central massif. The ditches were defended in enfilade by 57 mm guns in casemates resembling counterscarp batteries, firing at shot traps at the other end of the ditch. The fort is one of the larger Liège forts.

With the exception of the Fort de Loncin, the Belgian forts made little provision for the daily needs of their wartime garrisons, locating latrines, showers, kitchens and the morgue in the fort's counterscarp, a location that would be untenable in combat. This would have profound effects on the forts' ability to endure a long assault. The service areas were placed directly opposite the barracks, which opened into the ditch in the rear of the fort (i.e., in the face towards Liège), with lesser protection than the two "salient" sides. The Brialmont forts placed a weaker side to the rear to allow for recapture by Belgian forces from the rear, and located the barracks and support facilities on this side, using the rear ditch for light and ventilation of living spaces. In combat heavy shellfire made the rear ditch untenable, and German forces were able to get between the forts and attack them from the rear.

The Brialmont forts were designed to be protected from shellfire equaling their heaviest guns: 21 cm. The top of the central massif used 4 metres (13 ft) of unreinforced concrete, while the caserne walls, judged to be less exposed, used 1.5 metres (4.9 ft). Under fire, the forts were damaged by 21 cm weapons and could not withstand heavier artillery.

== Armament ==
Pontisse's armament included two turrets with a single 21 cm Krupp gun, a 15 cm turret with twin guns and two 12 cm turrets with two Krupp guns, all for distant targets. Four 57 mm gun turrets were provided for local defense. The fort also mounted an observation turret with a searchlight. Eight rapid-fire 57 mm guns were provided in casemates for the defense of the ditches and the postern.

The fort's heavy guns were German, typically Krupp, while the turret mechanisms were from a variety of sources. The fort was provided with signal lights to permit communication with the neighboring Fort de Liers and Fort de Barchon across the river. The guns were fired using black powder rather than smokeless powder, producing choking gas in the confined firing spaces that spread throughout the fort.

== First World War ==
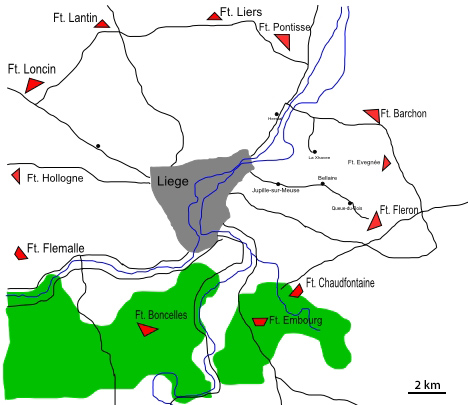
The Liège forts

Liège first came under attack on 6 August 1914. When Liège's fortifications proved unexpectedly stubborn, the Germans brought heavy siege artillery to bombard the forts with shells far larger than they were designed to resist. Pontisse was the first fort to come under bombardment from 42 cm artillery. It held out until 13 August 1914, when it surrendered, unable to resist any longer. The Germans improved Pontisse with better sanitary arrangements, ventilation and reinforced concrete in 1916. The Liège forts were reoccupied by the Belgian army in 1918 after the armistice.

== Fortified Position of Liège ==
Pontisse's armament was upgraded in the 1930s to become part of the Fortified Position of Liège II, which was planned to deter a German incursion over the nearby border. The armament was upgraded with new guns in the turrets and an anti-aircraft battery. This was accompanied by improvements to ventilation, protection, sanitary facilities, communications and electrical power. The 57mm guns were replaced with machine guns. As the most northern fort in PFL IV, it was tasked to support Fort Eben-Emael. A flanking bunker was built to survey the Laveau ravine and to serve as an alternate exit and as a source of ventilation air, in contrast to most of the other Liège forts, which used ventilation towers.

== Second World War ==
In May 1940 Pontisse was garrisoned by 223 men under the command of Captain-Commandant Fernand Pire. Following the successful German assault on Fort Eben-Emael to the east on May 11, Pontisse provided fire support for Belgian field units for the next few days, including firing on the area around Eben-Emael after Eben-Emael's surrender. Pontisse surrendered in its turn on May 18 following an air attack that destroyed the 105mm turret and damaged the 76mm turrets. Pontisse was, in any case, almost out of ammunition.

== Present ==
Pontisse was used as an army munitions depot after the war, then by a private munitions firm for the same purpose. It was stripped of its equipment by a salvager in the 1950s. The fort has been unoccupied since 1993. It is maintained as a refuge for bats during the winter months. It may be visited in the summer by arrangement.

== Bibliography ==
- Donnell, Clayton, The Forts of the Meuse in World War I, Osprey Publishing, Oxford, 2007, ISBN 978-1-84603-114-4.
- Kauffmann, J.E., Jurga, R., Fortress Europe: European Fortifications of World War II, Da Capo Press, USA, 2002, ISBN 0-306-81174-X.
