= Fort de Loncin =

19th-20th century defence for Liège, Belgium

- Part of Fortified Position of Liège
- Loncin, Belgium
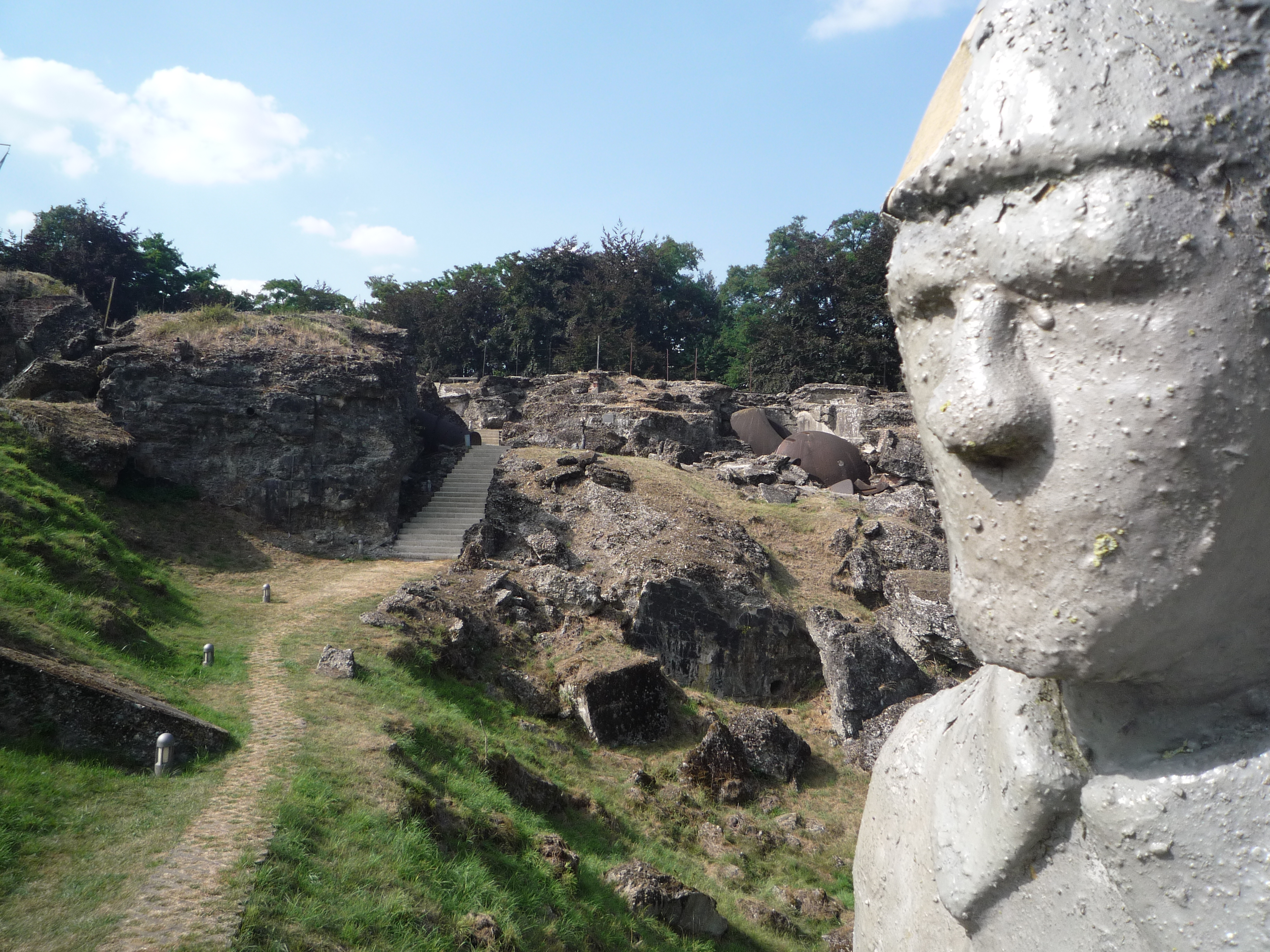
- The surface of the fort in 2013

Site information
- Type: Fort
- Owner: State of Belgium
- Controlled by: Belgium
- Open to the public: Yes
- Condition: Destroyed, ruins preserved

Location
- Coordinates: 50.6745°N 5.49246°E

Site history
- Built: 1881
- Materials: Unreinforced concrete
- Battles/wars: Battle of Liège

UNESCO World Heritage Site
- Official name: Funerary and memory sites of the First World War (Western Front)
- Type: Cultural
- Criteria: i, ii, vi
- Designated: 2023 (45th session)
- Reference no.: 1567-WA01

The Fort de Loncin (French pronunciation: [fɔʁ də lɔ̃sɛ̃]) is one of twelve forts built around Liège, Belgium, in the late 19th century. The overall Fortified Position of Liège was a constituent part of the country's National Redoubt. Fort de Loncin was constructed between 1881 and 1884 according to the plans of General Henri Alexis Brialmont. Contrasting with the French forts built in the same era by Raymond Adolphe Séré de Rivières, the fort was built exclusively of unreinforced concrete, a new material, rather than masonry.

The experimental nature of the new material, and the design features of the fort, led to unintended consequences in combat action. Weak concrete made the fort vulnerable to enemy artillery, while poor living conditions reduced the fort's ability to operate under fire.

The fort was destroyed during World War I in the Battle of Liège, when the fort's magazine was hit by a large-calibre German shell, killing most of the fort's occupants. The event marked the debut of the Big Bertha howitzer in combat. Relatively few of the dead were recovered; the site is now a military cemetery. The fort was never reused.

== Description ==
The Fort de Loncin is located about 7 kilometres (4.3 mi) west of the centre of Liège, in the direction of Brussels and Tongeren, in the municipality of Ans. The garrison comprised about 500 men.

The fort forms an isosceles triangle whose base is 300 metres (980 ft) long and whose sides measure 235 metres (771 ft). A 6-metre (20 ft) deep by 8-metre (26 ft) ditch encircles the fort, which is semi-submerged in the landscape. The principal armament was concentrated in the central massif. The ditches were defended in enfilade by 57 mm guns in casemates resembling counterscarp batteries, firing at shot traps at the other end of the ditch. The casemate at the point of the triangle was disposed on two levels, allowing action in case the lower level became obstructed. The fort made provisions for infantry sorties onto the surrounding cleared area.

With the exception of the Fort de Loncin, the Belgian forts made little provision for the daily needs of their wartime garrisons, locating latrines, showers, kitchens and the morgue in the fort's counterscarp, a location that would be untenable in combat. This would have profound effects on the forts' ability to endure a long assault. Even at Loncin, the service areas were placed directly opposite the barracks, which opened into the ditch in the rear of the fort (i.e., in the face towards Liège), with lesser protection than the two "salient" sides.

The Brialmont forts placed a weaker side to the rear to allow for recapture by Belgian forces from the rear, and located the barracks and support facilities on this side, using the rear ditch for light and ventilation of living spaces. In combat heavy shellfire made the rear ditch untenable, and German forces were able to get between the forts and attack them from the rear. Loncin was the only Liège fort to be provided with mechanical ventilation, allowing gun and sewage gases to be evacuated, and improving its combat endurance until debris blocked the exhaust. Loncin also provided better sanitary arrangements than its neighbors.

The Brialmont forts were designed to be protected from shellfire equaling their heaviest guns: 21 cm. The top of the central massif used 4 metres (13 ft) of unreinforced concrete, while the caserne walls, judged to be less exposed, used 1.5 metres (4.9 ft). Under fire, the forts were damaged by 21 cm fire and could not withstand heavier artillery.

== Armament ==
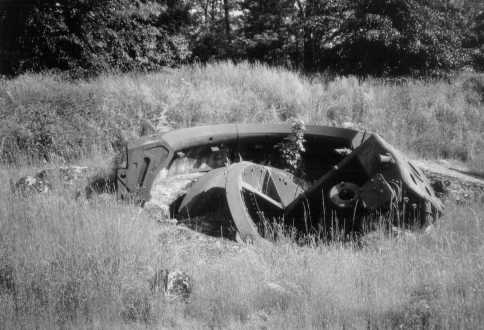
One of the destroyed howitzers.

- Two single 21 cm howitzer turrets, Grüsonwerke/Krupp
- One double 15 cm gun turret, Creusot/Van de Kerkhove
- Two double 12 cm gun turrets, Châtillon-Commentry/Krupp
- Four single 57mm gun turrets, Grusonwerke
- One observation turret with a searchlight
- Nine rapid-fire 57mm Nordenfeld guns in casemates for the defense of the ditches and the postern

The large weapons were all German products, made by Krupp in Essen, but the armor was by Cockerill (Belgium), Ateliers de Creusot (France) or Grüson (Germany). The fort was provided with signal lights to permit communication with the neighboring Fort de Lantin and Fort de Hollogne. The guns were fired using black powder rather than smokeless powder, producing choking gas in the confined firing spaces that spread throughout the fort.

== First World War ==
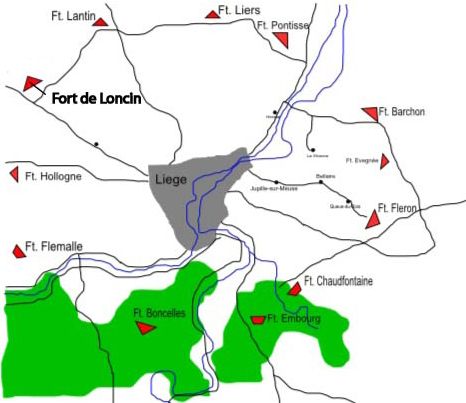
The Liège forts, with the Fort de Loncin highlighted

In 1914 the Fort de Loncin was one of the last Liège forts to suffer German bombardment. Liège first came under attack on 6 August 1914. Loncin was massively bombarded for three days from 12 to 15 August, before one of its two magazines, with twelve tons of explosive, blew up. The explosion destroyed the heart of the fort, killing 350 of the 550-man garrison, their bodies remaining under the wreckage. Loncin was the only fort at Liège that did not surrender. Many of the dead remain in the fort and the site is considered a war grave as well as a museum.

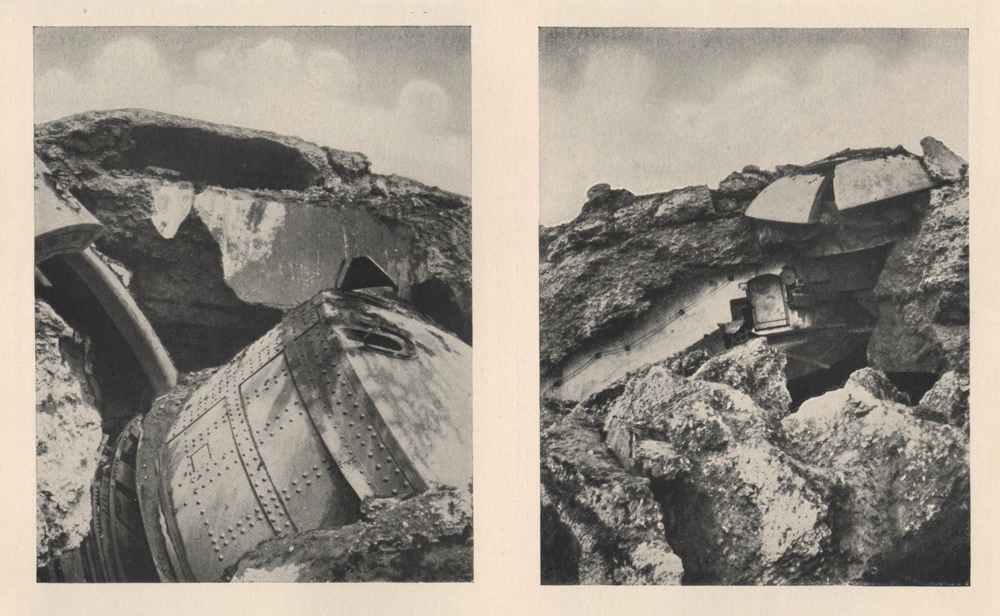
Ruins of the Fort de Loncin, 1914

The commander of the Liège sector, General Gérard Leman, had chosen the fort as his command post after Germans entered the center of Liège. Following the explosion he was rescued, unconscious or delirious, from the fort's ditch and made prisoner. The fort's commandant, Victor Naessens, wrote:

"Under the effect of this titanic volcano, what remained of the concrete massif was dislocated and the greater part of the garrison was crushed by blocks of concrete, burned alive or asphyxiated."

The 42 cm Big Bertha howitzer, the secret weapon of the German army in 1914, quickly became widely celebrated. The destruction of the Fort de Loncin was immediately used for propaganda by the Germans, precipitating the surrender of the last two Liège forts, Fort de Flémalle and Fort de Hollogne. The propaganda did much to cement the reputation of the Big Bertha.

=== Lessons of the destruction for the Belgians ===
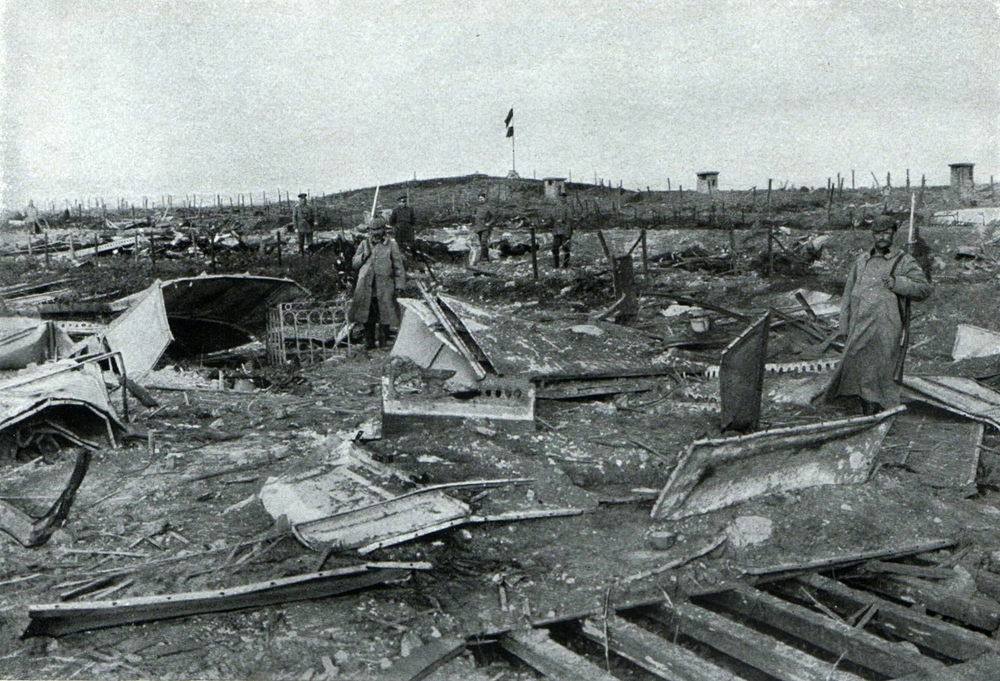
The destroyed fort

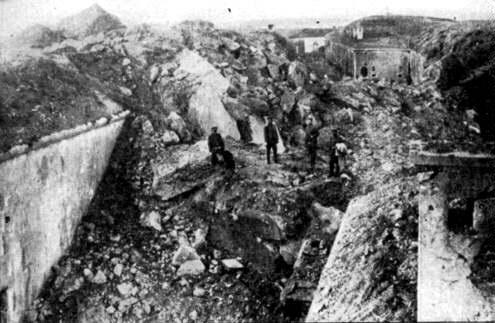
The destroyed fort

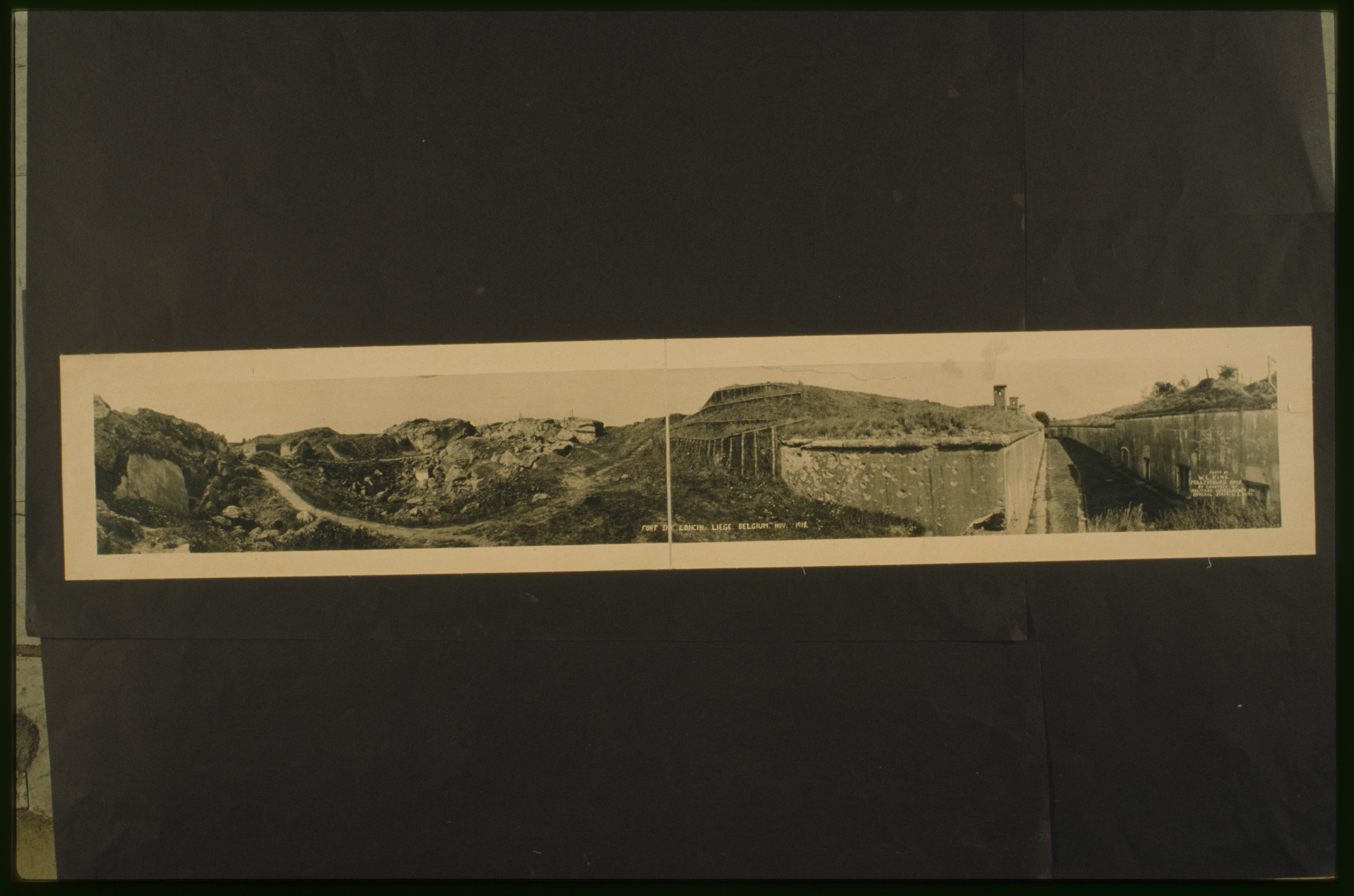
Ruins of the Fort de Loncin, November 1918

The principal reason for the destruction of the Fort de Loncin was that the ammunition magazines had been placed too close to the surface, and had never been upgraded since their construction to deal with improved artillery. Problems with concrete construction also became apparent, as techniques for concrete mixing, placement and construction were still being learned. In particular, a lack of nighttime illumination required that construction be stopped at the end of each day, and a poor understanding of the bonding properties of concrete caused weak points between daily pours of concrete, causing layers of concrete to separate under stress of bombardment or explosion.

These faults were cured with the reconstruction of other forts, the use of reinforced concrete, and with the construction of four new forts facing the German frontier to the east of Liège. The largest of these was Fort Eben-Emael, which would play a significant role at the beginning of the Second World War.

== Commemorative monument ==
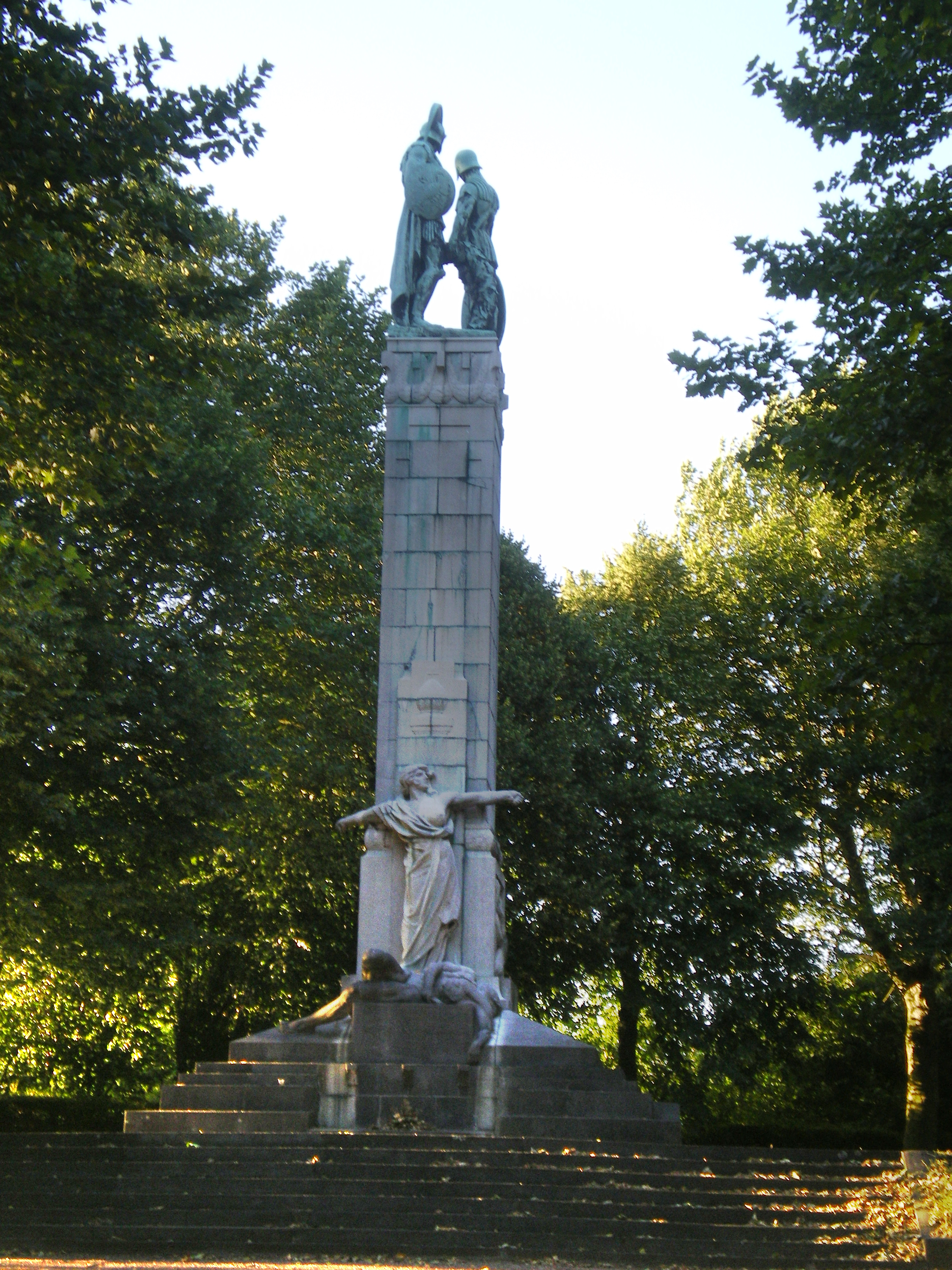
Monument to the Fort de Loncin's defenders

After the war Belgian sentiment of admiration for the fort's defenders resulted in a public subscription to erect a monument that King Albert I dedicated on 15 August 1923. The monument was sculpted by Liège sculptor Georges Petit, and comprises an 18-metre (59 ft) tower, with two 3-metre (9.8 ft) figures at the top representing Roman and Greek warriors rendering honor to the defenders of Loncin. Figures at the base include a woman with her arms spread over a dead soldier at her feet.

A separate monument features a tablet with the French inscription Passant... va dire à la Belgique et à la France qu'ici 550 belges se sont sacrifiés pour la défense de la liberté et le salut du monde ("Passer by... go say to Belgium and France that here 550 Belgians sacrificed themselves for the defense of freedom and the salvation of the world"), attributed to the French general Malleterre, based on the epitaph by Simonides for the Spartan dead at the Battle of Thermopylae. A number of other commemorative monuments were placed at the site, including the flamme du souvenir, a figure of a man thrusting a torch from under the earth.

== Present day ==
Since 15 August 1914 the Fort de Loncin has been treated as a war grave and place of remembrance. Of the more than 300 dead, the majority remain buried in the wreckage. The remains that have been recovered from the fort have been re-interred in a crypt at the head of the fort. The continuing presence of unexploded munitions was judged by the Belgian army in 2003 to be a potential hazard. In October 2007, after a project of mine and explosives clearance, 2,500 shells, representing 142 tons of munitions, were extracted. During this work 25 bodies were discovered, of which four were identified. All were re-interred on 15 August 2008.

== See also ==
- Fort d'Embourg, a renovated fort of the same era
- Fort de Lantin, an unrenovated fort
- Fort de Tancrémont, one of the four new forts built in the 1930s

== Sources ==
- Donnell, Clayton. The Forts of the Meuse in World War I. Oxford: Osprey Publishing, 2007. ISBN 978-1-84603-114-4
- Kauffmann, J.E., Jurga, R., Fortress Europe: European Fortifications of World War II, Da Capo Press, USA, 2002, ISBN 0-306-81174-X.
