= 5.7 cm Maxim-Nordenfelt =

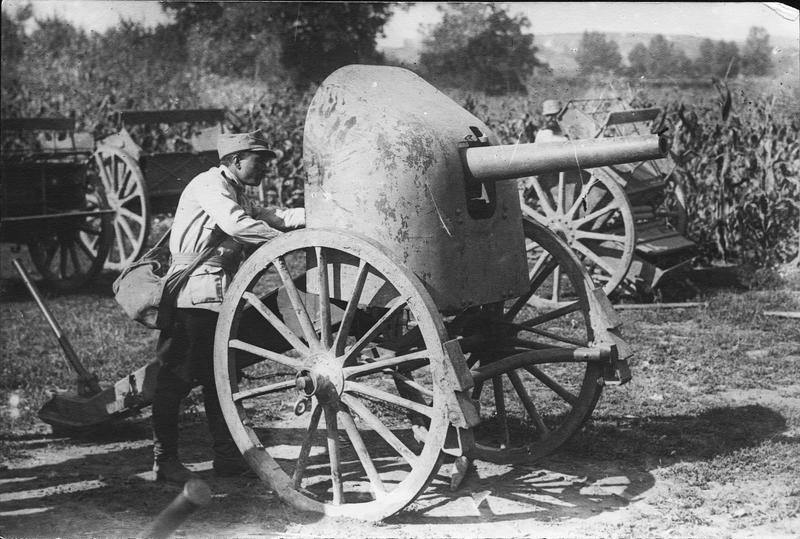
- A captured 5.7 cm Maxim-Nordenfeldt gun being inspected.
- Type: Fortress gun Infantry gun
- Place of origin: Great Britain

Service history
- In service: 1887–1918
- Used by: See § Users
- Wars: World War I

Production history
- Designer: Maxim-Nordenfelt
- Designed: 1887
- Manufacturer: Maxim-Nordenfelt
- No. built: 185 fortress guns 450 infantry guns
- Variants: Tank gun Anti-tank gun

Specifications
- Mass: Travel: 1,467 kg (3,234 lb); Combat: 860 kg (1,900 lb)
- Barrel length: 1.5 m (4 ft 11 in) L/26.3
- Shell: 57 x 224R Fixed QF ammunition
- Shell weight: 2.7 kg (5 lb 15 oz)
- Caliber: 57 mm (2.2 in)
- Breech: Vertical sliding-block
- Carriage: Box trail
- Elevation: -10° to +15°
- Rate of fire: 36 rpm
- Muzzle velocity: 401 m/s (1,320 ft/s)
- Effective firing range: 2.7 km (1.7 mi)
- Maximum firing range: 6.4 km (4 mi)

The 5.7 cm Maxim-Nordenfelt "Canon de caponnière" was a fortress gun and infantry gun developed during the 1880s in Britain which was sold to Belgium and later produced under license by the Cockerill company. It saw action during World War I in both Belgian and German hands.

== Design ==
=== Fortress gun ===
In 1887 the Belgian War Ministry ordered 185 5.7 cm fortress guns to arm their fortresses including Namur and Liege. The 5.7 cm Maxim-Nordenfelt was a short 26 caliber gun and not the longer 42-50 caliber QF 6-pounder Nordenfelt naval gun. It was a typical built-up gun of the period made of steel with a vertical sliding-block breech and it fired fixed QF ammunition of a number of different styles. The guns were mounted in Grusonwerke gun turrets or in armored casemates on central pivot mounts and used in an anti-personnel role.

=== Infantry gun ===
In addition to its fortress gun role, it was deployed in an infantry gun role. The guns were mounted on light two-wheeled box trail carriages without a recoil mechanism and protected by a three-sided gun shield. During 1914 the Germans captured large numbers of these guns and used them in the infantry gun role mainly to engage enemy machine gun nests in support of infantry assaults. In 1916 the Germans had 450 of these infantry guns in service.

=== Tank gun and anti-tank gun ===
In addition to the infantry gun role, the Germans used a number of guns to arm their A7V tanks and the guns were mounted in an armored casemate at the front of the vehicle with limited traverse. Some Maxim-Nordenfelts were also mounted on captured male Mark IV tanks as most of their original crews stripped them off their guns after abandoning them during the Battle of Cambrai. The Germans also mounted a number of guns on central-pivot mounts on flatbed truck chassis to act as mobile anti-tank guns.

== Belgian Forts ==
- Fort d'Andoy
- Fort de Barchon
- Fort de Boncelles
- Fort de Chaudfontaine
- Fort de Cognelée
- Fort de Dave
- Fort d'Embourg
- Fort d'Emines
- Fort d'Évegnée
- Fort de Flémalle
- Fort de Fléron
- Fort de Hollogne
- Fort de Lantin
- Fort de Liers
- Fort de Loncin
- Fort de Maizeret
- Fort de Malonne
- Fort de Marchovelette
- Fort de Pontisse
- Fort de Saint-Héribert
- Fort de Suarlée
- Fortified position of Liège
- Fortified position of Namur
- Fortified position of Antwerp
- Fort Liezele

== Photo Gallery ==
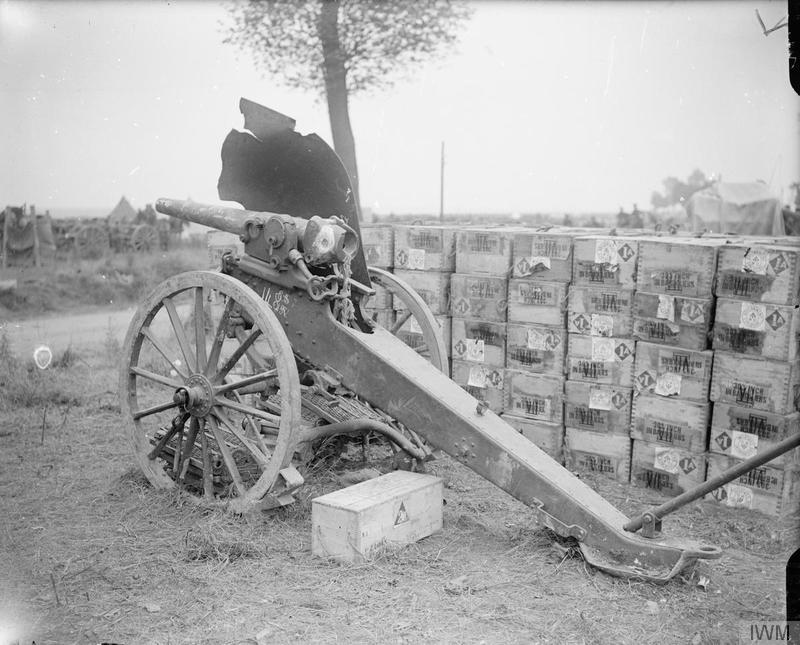
A captured German 5.7 cm Maxim-Nordenfelt gun with destroyed shield. Meaulte-Albert Road after the Battle of the Somme.

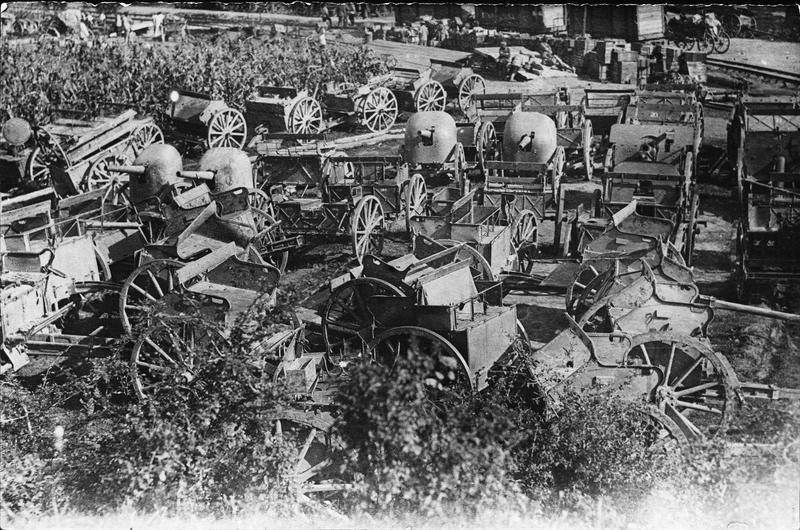
Captured guns in a depot.

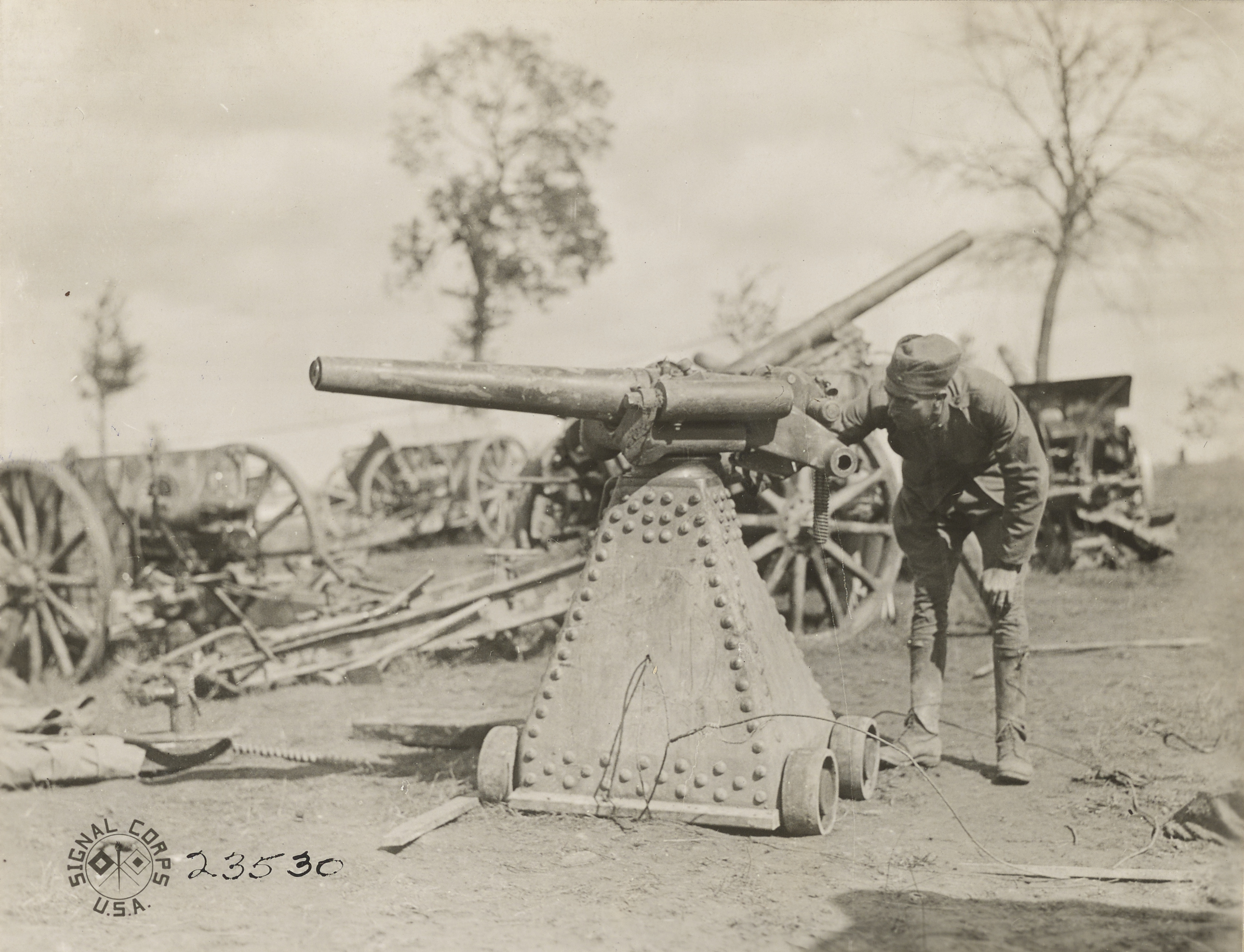
A Belgian casemate gun recaptured by American troops.

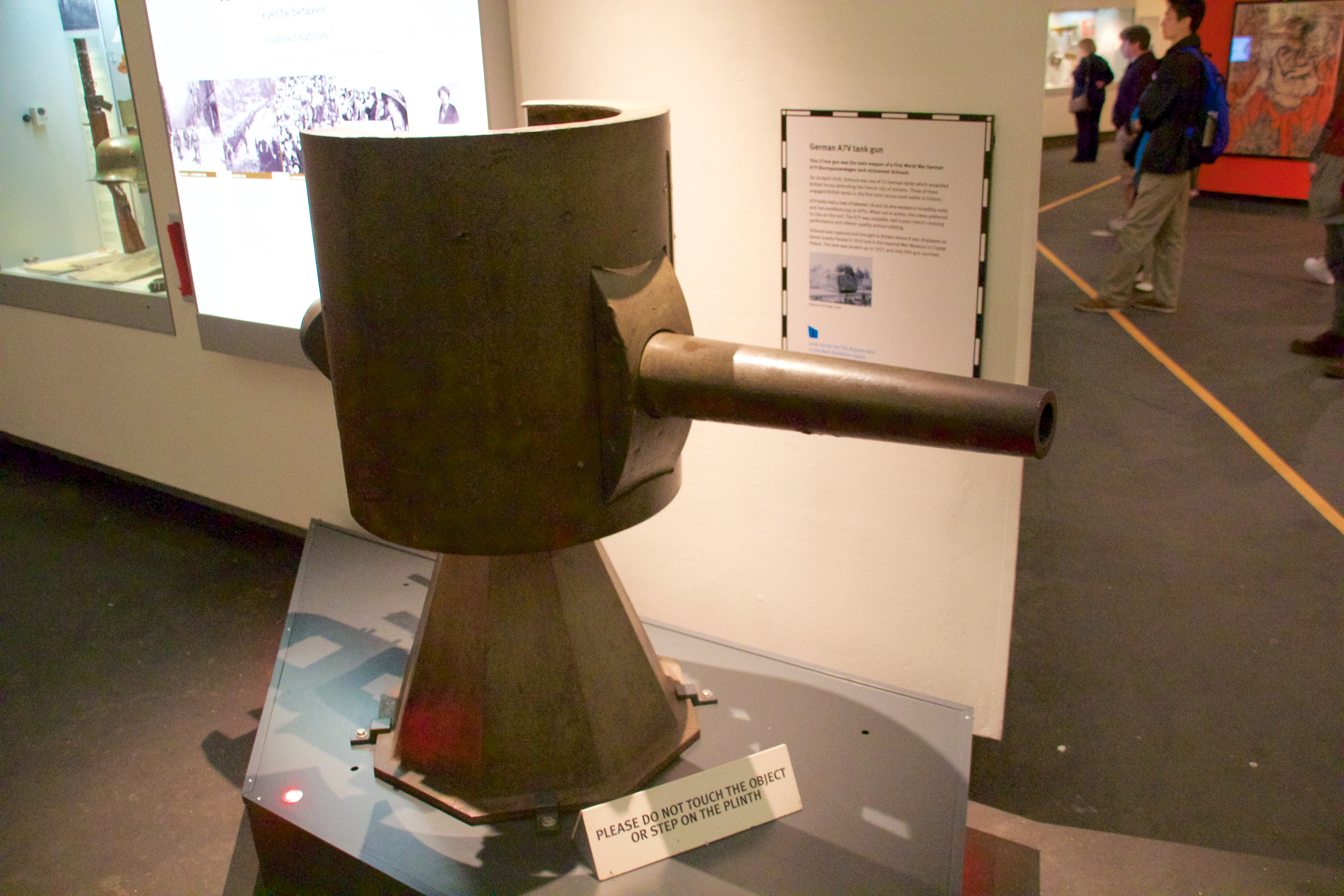
A7V tank gun at the Imperial War Museum North, Manchester, England

== Users ==
- Belgium
- Congo Free State – Force Publique
- German Empire – Captured from Belgium.
