= List of protected heritage sites in Chaudfontaine =

This table shows an overview of the protected heritage sites in the Walloon town Chaudfontaine. This list is part of Belgium's national heritage.

Object	Year/architect	Town/section	Address	Coordinates	Number^{?}	Image
Fountain called Belles Fontaines ^{(nl)} ^{(fr)}		Chaudfontaine	rue des Belles Fontaines	50.584600°N 5.643665°E	62022-CLT-0001-01 Info	Monumentale fontein, genaamd Belles Fontaines
Weeping Beech tree in villa park ^{(nl)} ^{(fr)}		Chaudfontaine	avenue des Thermes n° 138	50.587275°N 5.650884°E	62022-CLT-0002-01 Info	
Tulip tree ^{(nl)} ^{(fr)}		Chaudfontaine		50.587636°N 5.651884°E	62022-CLT-0003-01 Info	
Sauveur house ^{(nl)} ^{(fr)}		Chaudfontaine	rue des Belles Fontaines n° 138	50.585458°N 5.641308°E	62022-CLT-0004-01 Info	Huis Sauveur: gevels, puntgevels en daken
17th century church tower of the church of St. Jean ^{(nl)} ^{(fr)}		Chaudfontaine	Beaufays	50.562237°N 5.649853°E	62022-CLT-0005-01 Info	Toren van de 17e-eeuwse kerk Saint-Jean
Church of St. Jean ^{(nl)} ^{(fr)}		Chaudfontaine	Beaufays	50.562291°N 5.649651°E	62022-CLT-0006-01 Info	Kerk Saint-Jean
Rocks of the Bout du Monde ^{(nl)} ^{(fr)}		Chaudfontaine		50.580873°N 5.605201°E	62022-CLT-0007-01 Info	
Bout du Monde ^{(nl)} ^{(fr)}		Chaudfontaine		50.580502°N 5.602491°E	62022-CLT-0008-01 Info	
Colline de Chèvremont ^{(nl)} ^{(fr)}		Chaudfontaine		50.598803°N 5.639092°E	62022-CLT-0009-01 Info	
Colline de Chèvremont (extension) ^{(nl)} ^{(fr)}		Chaudfontaine		50.598918°N 5.639346°E	62022-CLT-0010-01 Info	
Parts of a priory ^{(nl)} ^{(fr)}		Chaudfontaine	Beaufays	50.562576°N 5.650043°E	62022-CLT-0013-01 Info	
Priory grounds ^{(nl)} ^{(fr)}		Chaudfontaine	Beaufays	50.562187°N 5.649902°E	62022-CLT-0014-01 Info	
Chapel of Notre-Dame de Chèvremont ^{(nl)} ^{(fr)}		Chaudfontaine		50.597283°N 5.639017°E	62022-CLT-0016-01 Info	Totaliteit van de kapel Notre-Dame de Chèvremont
2 Train tunnel entrances ^{(nl)} ^{(fr)}		Chaudfontaine		50.585117°N 5.652411°E	62022-CLT-0017-01 Info	De totaliteit van de twee ingangen van de spoortunnel op de NMBS-lijn 6 tussen de stations Chaudfontaine en La Brouck en het ensemble van de tunnel en de omliggende gronden.
Thier des Milords ^{(nl)} ^{(fr)}		Chaudfontaine		50.585432°N 5.650469°E	62022-CLT-0018-01 Info	
Old houses ^{(nl)} ^{(fr)}		Chaudfontaine	rue des Bruyères, Vaux-Sous-Chèvremont	50.596040°N 5.634939°E	62022-CLT-0020-01 Info	
Two oaks and surroundings ^{(nl)} ^{(fr)}		Chaudfontaine	rue Alexis Curvers n° 18	50.593706°N 5.610780°E	62022-CLT-0022-01 Info	
Chaudfontaine train station ^{(nl)} ^{(fr)}		Chaudfontaine	Chaudfontaine	50.586848°N 5.643965°E	62022-CLT-0025-01 Info	Gevels en daken, uitgezonderd de voorgevel naar de haven
Lane of basswood or linden trees ^{(nl)} ^{(fr)}		Chaudfontaine	rue des Bruyères n° 100, Beaufays	50.559127°N 5.627142°E	62022-CLT-0027-01 Info	

== See also ==
- List of protected heritage sites in Liège (province)
