= Lantin =

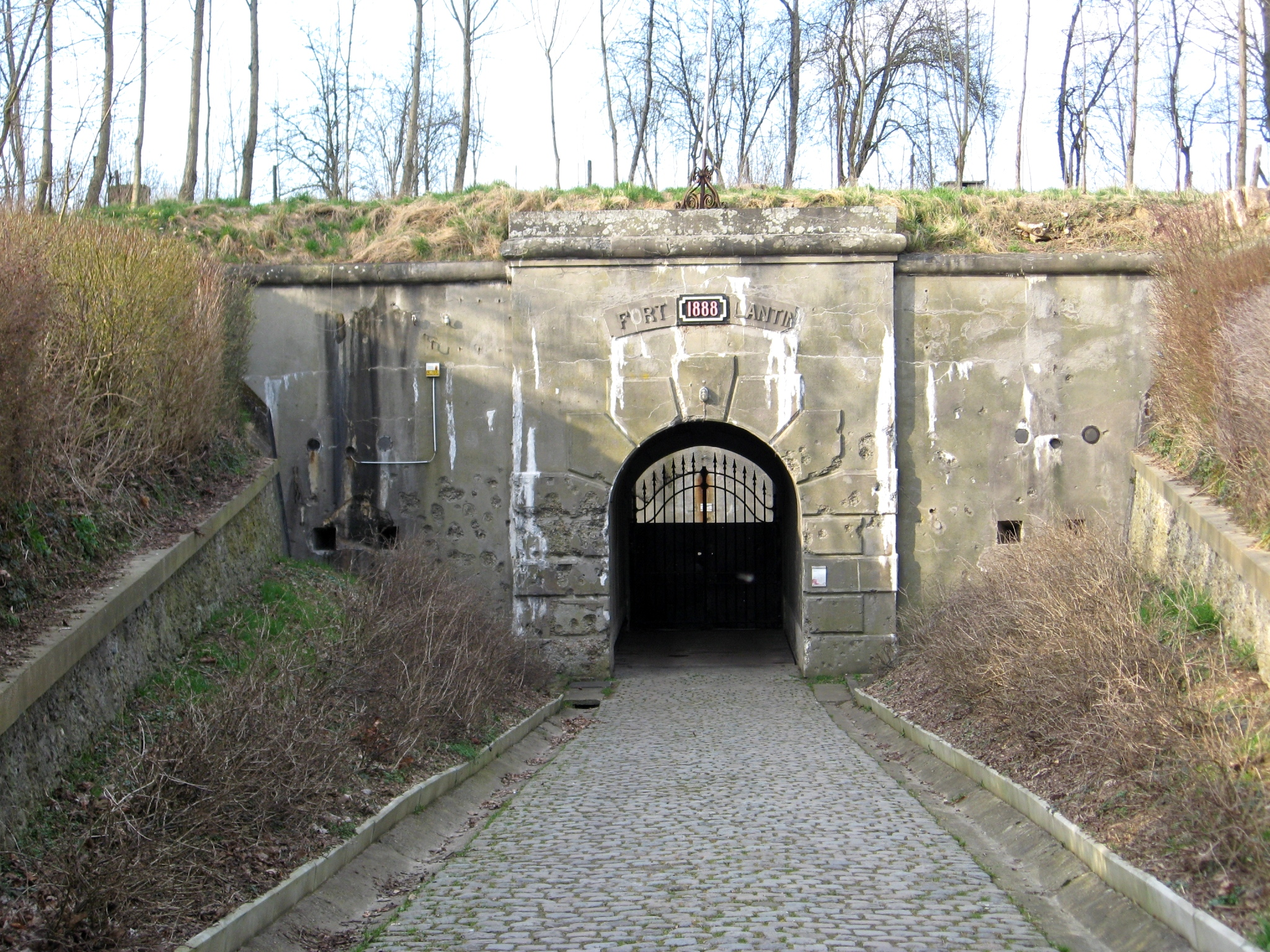
- Fort de Lantin in Lantin

- Location within Belgium Location within Europe
- Coordinates: 50°41′17″N 05°31′26″E
- Country: Belgium
- Region: Wallonia
- Province: Liège
- Municipality: Juprelle

Lantin is a district of the municipality of Juprelle, located in the province of Liège, Belgium.

The etymology of the place is derived from a Gallo-Roman name, Lantius. A village developed here during the Middle Ages; during the Wars of Liège the village was burnt down in 1468 by the troops of Charles the Bold. Around 500 villagers were reportedly burnt alive. In the late 19th-century the Fort de Lantin was built here, part of a series of fortifications aimed to protect the city of Liège. It was a site of action during World War I. Apart from the fort, the village church is also a historical building, in its current form dating from the 18th century and a listed building.
