= Chaudfontaine =

Municipality in Liège Province, Wallonia, Belgium

Chaudfontaine Tchôfontinne (Walloon)
- Municipality
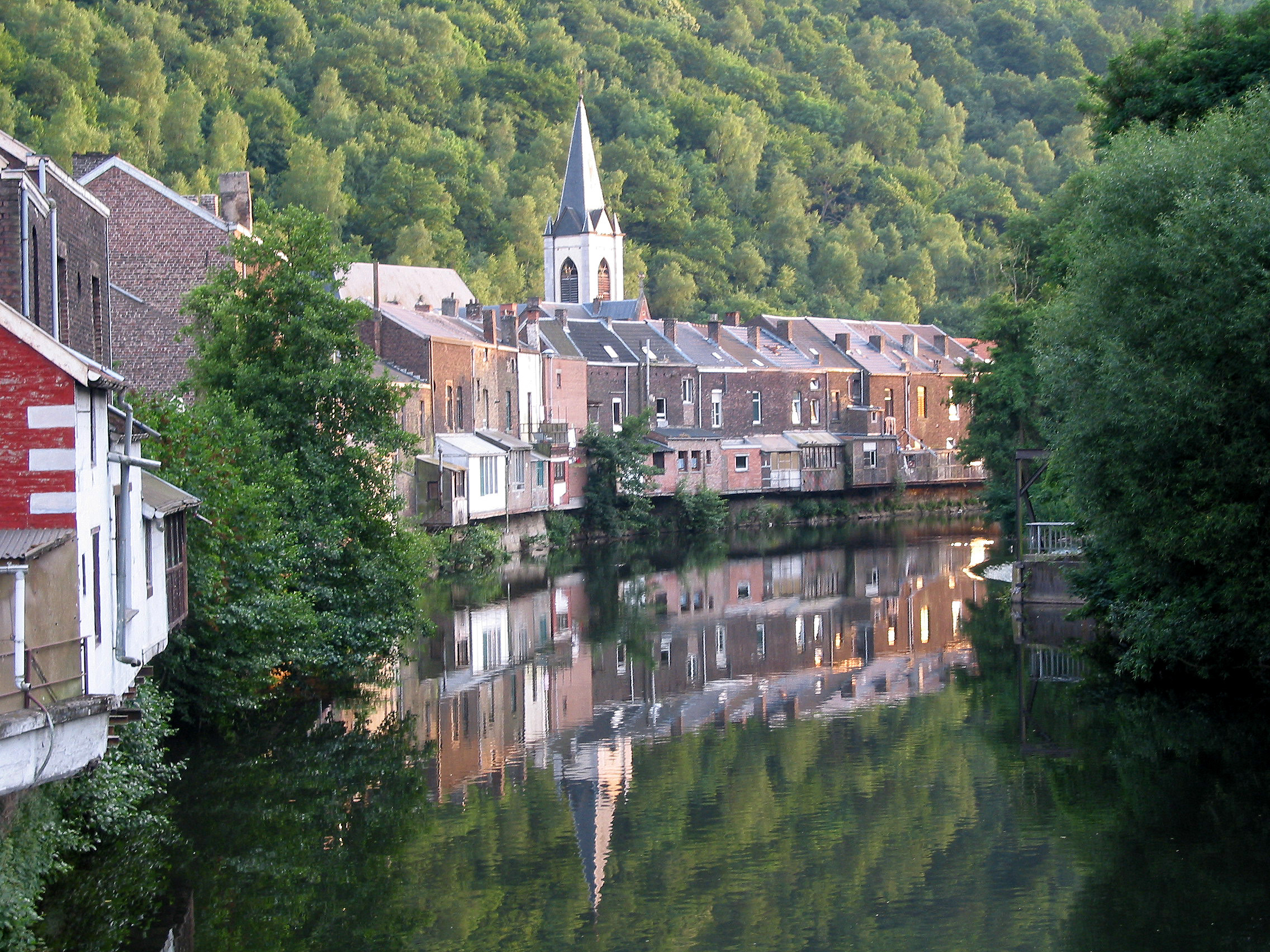

- Flag Coat of arms

- Location of Chaudfontaine in Liège province
- Interactive map of Chaudfontaine
- Location in Belgium
- Coordinates: 50°35′N 05°38′E
- Country: Belgium
- Community: French Community
- Region: Wallonia
- Province: Liège
- Arrondissement: Liège

Government
  - Mayor: Laurent Burton
  - Governing party: UP!

Area
  - Total: 25.46 km^{2} (9.83 sq mi)

Population (2018-01-01)
  - Total: 20,935
  - Density: 822.3/km^{2} (2,130/sq mi)
- Postal codes: 4050-4053
- NIS code: 62022
- Area codes: 04
- Website: www.chaudfontaine.be

Chaudfontaine is also a brand of mineral water, owned by The Coca-Cola Company.

Chaudfontaine (French pronunciation: [ʃofɔ̃tɛn]; Walloon: Tchôfontinne) is a municipality of Wallonia located in the province of Liège, Belgium.

On January 1, 2006, Chaudfontaine had a total population of 21,012. The total area is 25.52 km^{2} which gives a population density of 823 inhabitants per km^{2}.

The municipality consists of the following districts: Beaufays, Chaudfontaine, Embourg, and Vaux-sous-Chèvremont.

Some of its best-known enterprises are Galler chocolates, Magotteaux and Chaudfontaine drinking waters.

Chaudfontaine was strongly hit by the 2021 European floods.

== History ==
The Fort de Chaudfontaine was built between 1881 and 1884 on the heights above the town.

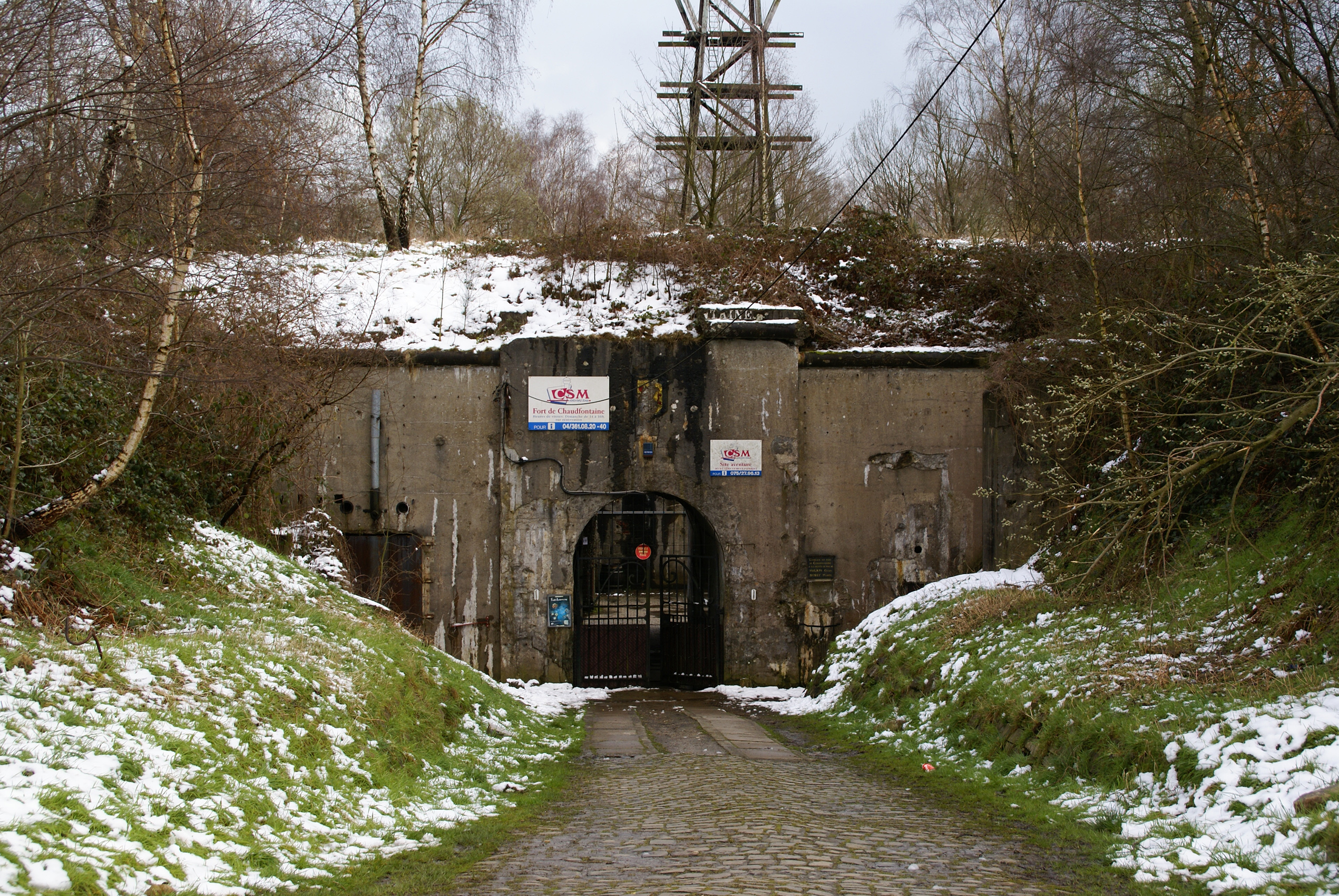
Fort de Chaudfontaine

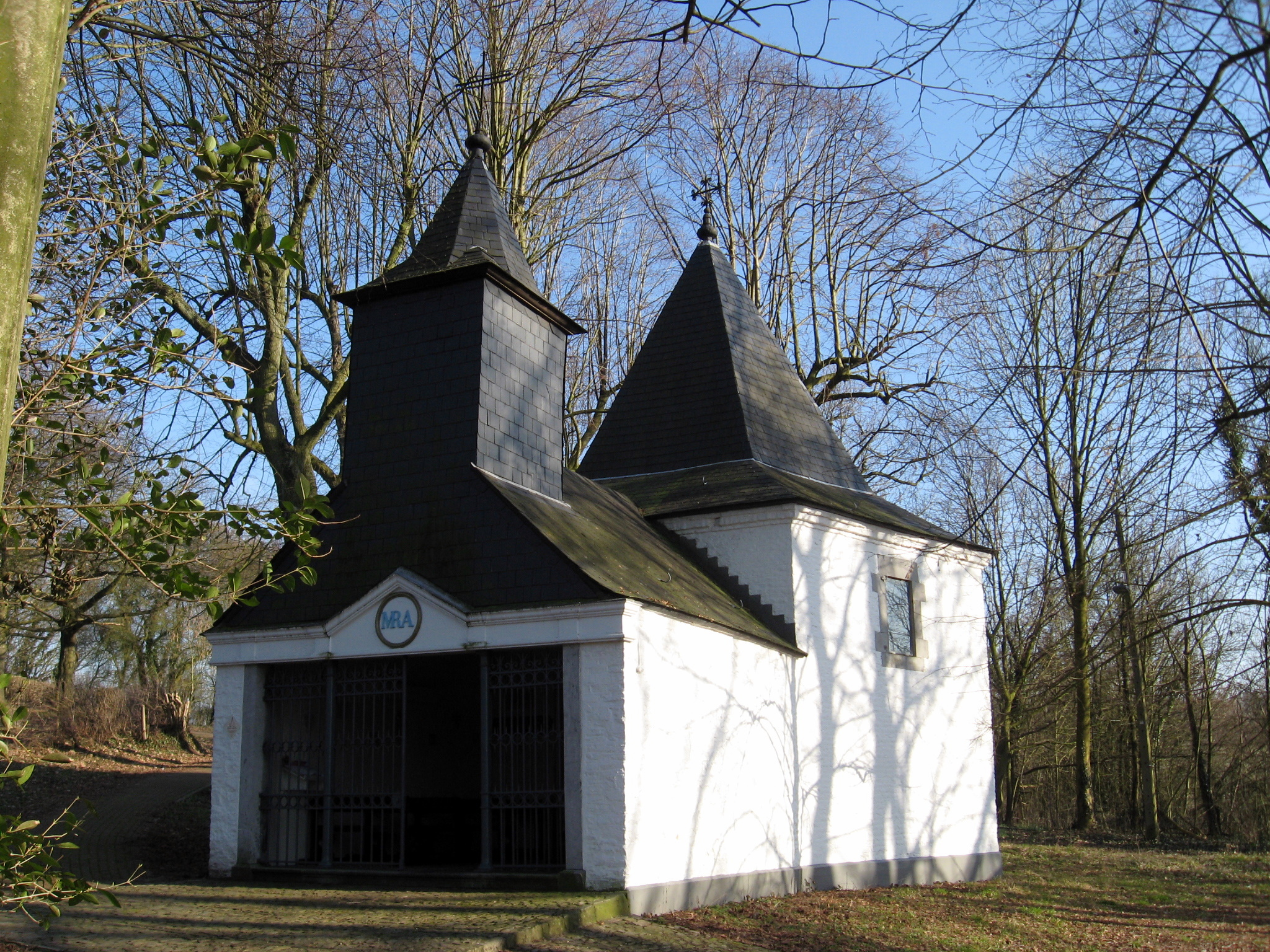
Notre-Dame de Chèvremont Chapel

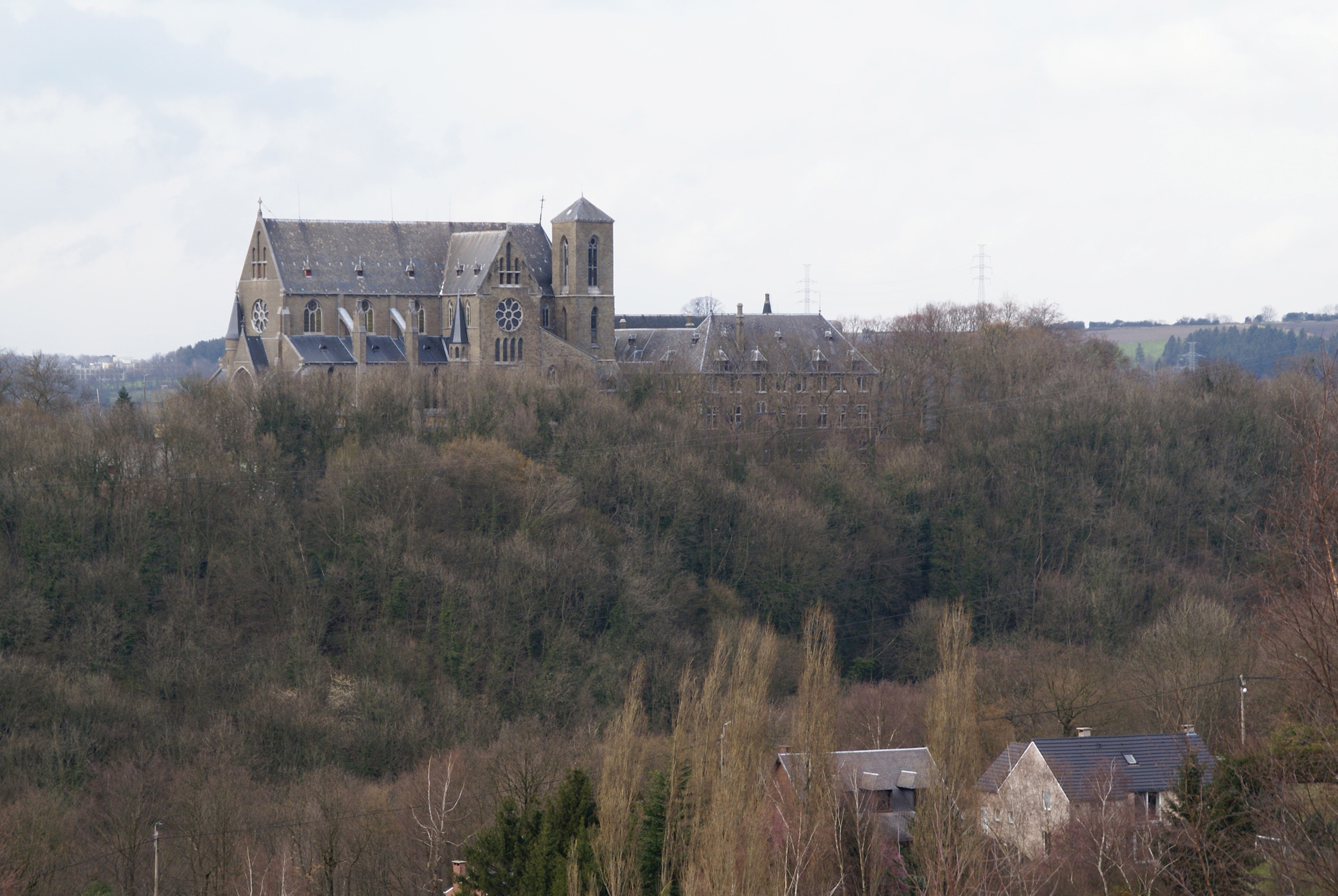
The Basilica and Convent of the Carmelite Fathers of Chèvremont

== See also ==
- List of protected heritage sites in Chaudfontaine
