= Fort de Liers =

19th-20th century defence for Liège, Belgium

- Part of Fortified Position of Liège
- Liers, Belgium

Site information
- Type: Fort
- Controlled by: Belgium
- Open to the public: No
- Condition: Industrial site

Location
- Coordinates: 50.69964°N 5.58191°E

Site history
- Built: 1881
- Materials: Unreinforced concrete
- Battles/wars: Battle of Liège

The Fort de Liers (French pronunciation: [fɔʁ də ljɛʁs]) is one of twelve forts built around Liège, Belgium, in the late 19th century. The overall Fortified Position of Liège was a constituent part of the country's National Redoubt. Fort de Liers was built between 1881 and 1884 according to the plans of General Henri Alexis Brialmont. Contrasting with the French forts built in the same era by Raymond Adolphe Séré de Rivières, the fort was built exclusively of unreinforced concrete, a new material, rather than masonry. The fort was heavily bombarded by German artillery in the Battle of Liège. Liers was never upgraded like the other forts of Liège. It is now used as a test site for aircraft engines and is not accessible to the public.

== Description ==
The Fort de Liers is located about 6.5 kilometres (4.0 mi) north of the center of Liège, near Liers. one of the smaller Liège forts, Liers forms an isosceles triangle. A 6-metre (20 ft) deep by 8-metre (26 ft) ditch encircles the fort. The principal armament was concentrated in the central massif. The ditches were defended in enfilade by 57 mm guns in casemates resembling counterscarp batteries, firing at shot traps at the other end of the ditch.

With the exception of the Fort de Loncin, the Belgian forts made little provision for the daily needs of their wartime garrisons, locating latrines, showers, kitchens and the morgue in the fort's counterscarp, a location that would be untenable in combat. This would have profound effects on the forts' ability to endure a long assault. The service areas were placed directly opposite the barracks, which opened into the ditch in the rear of the fort (i.e., in the face towards Liège), with lesser protection than the two "salient" sides. The Brialmont forts placed a weaker side to the rear to allow for recapture by Belgian forces from the rear, and located the barracks and support facilities on this side, using the rear ditch for light and ventilation of living spaces. In combat heavy shellfire made the rear ditch untenable, and German forces were able to get between the forts and attack them from the rear.

The Brialmont forts were designed to be protected from shellfire equaling their heaviest guns: 21 cm. The top of the central massif used 4 metres (13 ft) of unreinforced concrete, while the caserne walls, judged to be less exposed, used 1.5 metres (4.9 ft). Under fire, the forts were damaged by 21 cm fire and could not withstand heavier artillery.

== Armament ==
Liers' armament included a turret with a single 21 cm gun, a 15 cm turret with twin guns and a 12 cm turret with two guns, all for distant targets. 57 mm gun turrets were provided for local defense. The fort also mounted an observation turret with a searchlight. Rapid-fire 57 mm guns were provided in casemates for the defense of the ditches, as well as in turrets.

The fort's heavy guns were German, typically Krupp, while the turret mechanisms were from a variety of sources. The fort was provided with signal lights to permit communication with the neighboring Fort de Loncin. The guns were fired using black powder rather than smokeless powder, producing choking gas in the confined firing spaces that spread throughout the fort.

== First World War ==
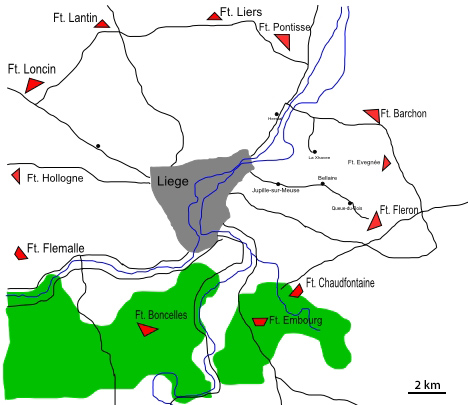
The Liège forts

Liège first came under attack on 6 August 1914. When the Liège's fortifications proved unexpectedly stubborn, the Germans brought heavy siege artillery to bombard the forts with shells far larger than they were designed to resist. Liers was heavily bombarded starting 13 August. Liers' neighbor, the Fort de Pontisse, surrendered the same day, allowing the Germans to concentrate on Liers, firing from the fort's vulnerable rear. Liers surrendered on the 14th, with the interior of the fort uninhabitable due to dust, gun gas and sewage.

== Second World War ==
Liers was not upgraded in the 1930s as part of the Fortified Position of Liège. The Belgian Army used the fort to store munitions.

== Post-war and present ==
Following the war the Fort de Liers was sold by the military to Fabrique Nationale (FN) for one franc in 1949, FN eventually becoming Techspace Aero. The fort is used as a testing area of aircraft engines by Techspace Aero, whose plant adjoins the fort, and is not accessible to the public. The fort's shape remains discernible, with sound control ducting closely adjoining the central massif of the fort.

== Bibliography ==
- Donnell, Clayton, The Forts of the Meuse in World War I, Osprey Publishing, Oxford, 2007, ISBN 978-1-84603-114-4.
- Kauffmann, J.E., Jurga, R., Fortress Europe: European Fortifications of World War II, Da Capo Press, USA, 2002, ISBN 0-306-81174-X.
