= Société des forges de Châtillon-Commentry-Neuves-Maisons =

French steelmaking company

Compagnie anonyme de Châtillon et Commentry 1862-1898 Société des forges de Châtillon-Commentry-Neuves-Maisons 1898-1979
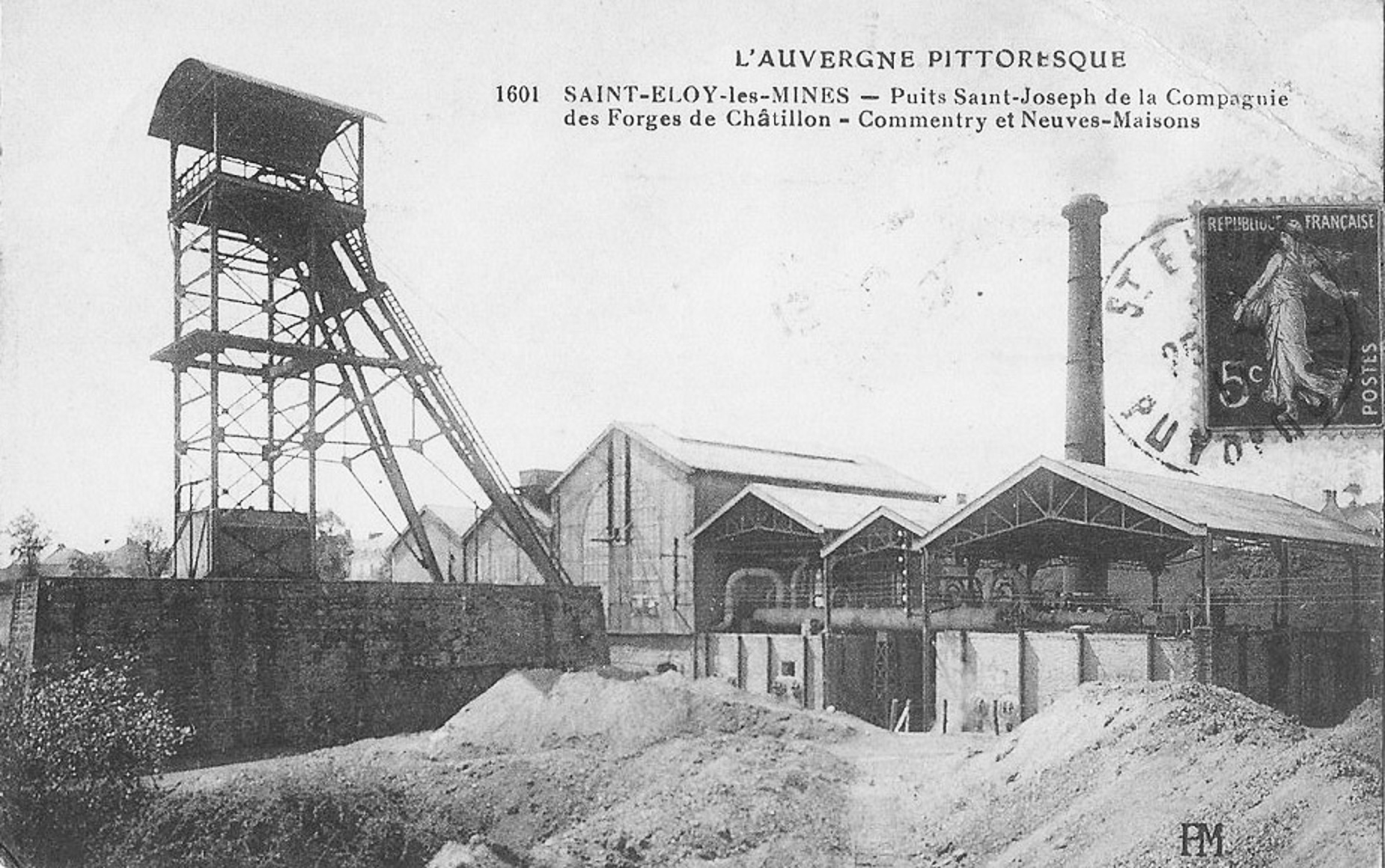
- Industry: Iron and steel
- Predecessor: Société Bouguéret, Martenot et Cie (1846)
- Founded: 1862
- Defunct: 1979
- Successor: Usinor, others
- Headquarters: Paris, France

The Compagnie anonyme de Châtillon et Commentry was a French steelmaking company, formed as a limited company in 1862 from the Société Bouguéret, Martenot et Cie., a creation from the combination of several French iron makers in 1846.

In 1898 the company merged with the Société métallurgique de Champigneulles et Neuves-Maisons to form the Société des forges de Châtillon-Commentry-Neuves-Maisons.

In 1979 the works became part of Usinor, forming part of the Unimetal division in 1984. By 2000 the plant in Neuves-Maisons had become part of the Riva Group and as of 2011 produces mainly long products including rebar from scrap metal using electric arc furnaces.

== History ==
=== Compagnie anonyme de Châtillon et Commentry ===
Metal working in the Châtillonais region dated back to the Iron Age, with a ready supply of wood from the region's forests, and near surface deposits of iron ore the area became one of the major production centres of iron in France in the 19th century, the company Bazile, Louis-Maître & Cie. was formed in 1824 by several ironworks owners, one of whom Auguste de Marmont had introduced the 'English process' of using coke from coal in iron production.

In Allier, Nicholas Rambourg took advantage of the availability of wood for charcoal production in the Forest of Tronçais and started iron production in 1788.

The organisation Société Bouguéret, Martenot et Cie. (Note: Also known as the Société des forges de Châtillon et Commentry.) was formed in 1846 from the merging of the businesses of forgemasters in Allier and Châtillon. The founders of the company include members of the families Bouguéret, Martenot, Bazile, Rambourg, Maître, Humbert and others; the new société had 37 blast furnaces, 56 forges, 3 wire works, and 4 puddling furnaces.

In 1862 conversion to a limited company took place, the company then took the name Compagnie anonyme de Châtillon et Commentry.

=== Société métallurgique de Champigneulles et Neuves-Maisons ===
The Société Métallurgique de la Haute-Moselle was formed in 1872 by Victor de Lespinats and others; the loss of Alsace-Lorraine by France as a result the 1870 Franco-Prussian War meant the loss of many iron and steelworks; new production sites were needed and the site in Chavigny (Neuves-Maisons) was chosen a due to the presence of iron deposits, and proximity to the Nancy-Dijon railway line and the planned Canal de l'Est. The first blast furnace opened in 1874, and a second in 1882. The company also operated the mine of Maron-Val de Fert in Neuves-Maisons.

In Liverdun iron making activities had begun in 1864 with the opening of an iron mine by Barbe et Schmidt. Three blast furnaces, a foundry and rolling mill had been built by 1868. Mineral extraction ended in 1877 and the associated works cease by 1879. Activities restarted in 1881 as des forges et laminoirs de Champigneulles.

In 1887 the Métallurgique de Haute Moselle merged with the Forges de Champigneulles to form the Société Métallurgique de Champigneulles et Neuves Maisons. In 1897 the company merged with Châtillon et Commentry.

=== Société des forges de Châtillon-Commentry-Neuves-Maison ===
In 1898 Compagnie anonyme de Châtillon et Commentry merged with the Société métallurgique de Champigneulles et Neuves-Maisons, and became the Société des forges de Châtillon-Commentry-Neuves-Maisons.

At Neuves-Maisons production continued; by 1898 the works had five blast furnace; in 1902 a Gilchrist–Thomas converter was installed, and in rolling mills for long products installed the following year, in 1905 a mill for slag was added. A Siemens-Martin furnace was added 1909, and the next year facilities for production of wire added. By 1914 seven blast furnaces had been installed.

The Usine Saint-Jacques in Montluçon (Allier) (founded 1848.) was initially a smelter, but had rapidly expanded into steel making using Siemens-Martin, Gilchrist, and Bessemer converters; by the 1900s it was operating 8 Siemens-Martin furnaces. It specialised in castings and forgings. It was affected negatively by the Washington Naval Treaty as production of battleship turrets, gun fittings and projectiles was an important element of its business, after which the company diversified into mechanical engineering, including turbines, railway and other transport equipment. A subsidiary rolling mill existed at Commentry. It closed in 1964.

In 1917 the company Forges de Châtillon-Commentry-Neuves-Maison together with the Société de Construction des Batignolles founded the locomotive manufacturer Compagnie générale de construction de locomotives (Batignolles-Châtillon) in Nantes.

In 1955 the works in Neuves-Maisons, plus the associated lime kilns in Vaucouleurs, (Note: The lime kilns date to 1875, founded by Ernest Good to produce lime from rock extracted from a nearby quarry. The kilns ceased operation in 1967.) and wire mills in Sainte-Colombe and Vierzon became the Société des Aciéries et Tréfilerie de Neuves-Maisons Chatillon, this became a subsidiary of Hainaut-Sambre in 1967. The works was further developed; in 1969 the Gilchrist-Thomas unit was converted to Oxygen steelmaking, and in the 1970s more mill trains were added including a second wire mill. The Chatillon wire mill company merged with the Société des Hauts Forneaux de la Chiers, and the Compagnie des Forges de Châtillon-Commentry-Biache to form the Compagnie industrielle Chiers Châtillon (CICC) in 1977, which was merged into Usinor in 1979.

== Legacy ==
Neuves-Maisons

After acquisition by Usinor in 1979 the works in Neuves-Maisons underwent restructuring - a transition to electrically produced steel, and a concentration towards long products took place in the 1980s: the Siemens-Martin plant and coke ovens were closed, and a new continuous casting plant built, in 1985 all the liquid phase operations ended and a UHP electric arc furnace installed. In 1993 the plant along with works in Montereau becomes part of the société des aciers d’armature du béton (SAM), and three cold drawing lines were installed. In 1995 the company is acquired by the British firm Allied Steel and Wire, then in 2000 is acquired by the Riva Group. In 2004 steel production was ~840,000t pa, and employed 441 people. In 2006 production was from scrap metal by electrical plant producing continuous cast billets, with processing to wire rod and rebar.
