= Henri Alexis Brialmont =

Belgian military engineer (1821–1903)

Henri-Alexis Brialmont
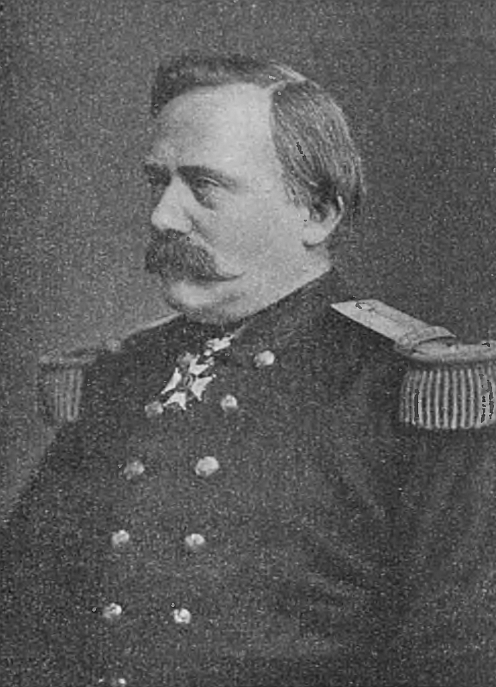
- Born: 25 May 1821; Venlo, United Netherlands (modern-day Netherlands)
- Died: 21 July 1903 (aged 82); Brussels, Belgium
- Known for: Contributions to military engineering and fortifications
- Spouse: Justa de Potter

Henri-Alexis Brialmont (Venlo, 25 May 1821 – Brussels, 21 July 1903), nicknamed The Belgian Vauban after the French military architect, was a Belgian army officer, politician and writer of the 19th century, best known as a military architect and designer of fortifications. Brialmont qualified as an officer in the Belgian army engineers in 1843 and quickly rose up the ranks. He served as a staff officer, and later was given command of the district of the key port of Antwerp. He finished his careers as Inspector-General of the Army. Brialmont was also an active pamphleteer and political campaigner and lobbied through his career for reform and expansion of the Belgian military and was also involved in the foundation of the Congo Free State.

Today, Brialmont is best known for the fortifications which he designed in Belgium and Romania and would influence another in the Democratic Republic of the Congo. The fortifications he designed in Belgium at the end of the 1880s around the towns of Liège, Namur and Antwerp would play an important role during the early stages of the German invasion of Belgium during World War I.

== Early life ==
Henri-Alexis Brialmont was born in Venlo in Dutch Limburg in 1821. His father, Mathieu Brialmont, had served in the French Grande Armée during the Napoleonic Wars and had reached the rank of captain. During Dutch rule in Belgium, Mathieu served in the Dutch army and, after Belgian independence in 1830, joined the Belgian army. In 1849 he was made General, and was appointed Minister of War in 1850. Although Venlo is not situated in Belgium today, the whole of Limburg was a disputed territory over which the Belgian government claimed control after the Belgian Revolution. Belgium was forced to relinquish its claims at the Treaty of London in 1839 and today Limburg is divided in a Dutch and a Belgian part.

Henri-Alexis performed poorly at school but succeeded in getting into a military academy. In 1859, during his military career, he married the daughter of the journalist and leading figure of the Belgian Revolution, Louis de Potter.

== Military career ==
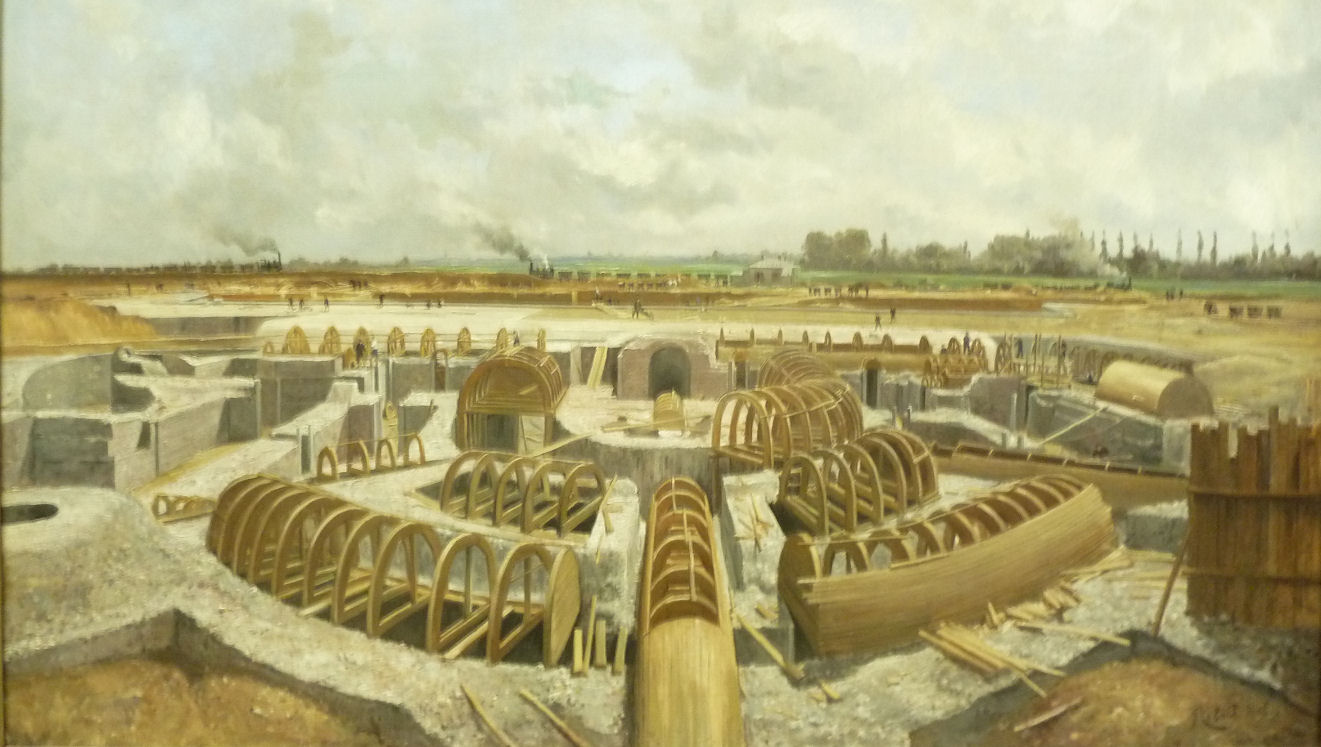
Painting depicting a Belgian fort of the period under construction

Brialmont graduated from military school in 1843 as a Sous-lieutenant of the Engineers. He quickly rose up the ranks, being promoted to lieutenant in 1847. From 1847 to 1850 he was private secretary to the war minister, General Baron Félix Chazal. In 1855 he entered the staff corps, was promoted to the rank of major in 1861, lieutenant-colonel in 1864, colonel in 1868. In 1874 he was promoted to major-general and was appointed to oversee the fortifications of Belgium's major port, Antwerp, the same year. In 1877 he was promoted to Lieutenant General and later to Inspector-General of the Army; a post which he held until his retirement in 1892.

During the Belgian response to the Franco-Prussian War of 1870–71, Brialmont, then a colonel, served as chief-of-staff of the Army of Antwerp, assigned to defending the National Redoubt at Antwerp. However, during his whole military career, Brialmont never once served in a war, even though some Belgian soldiers served as volunteers during the Mexican Adventure (1861–67) and during fighting for the Unification of Italy.

== Political activities ==
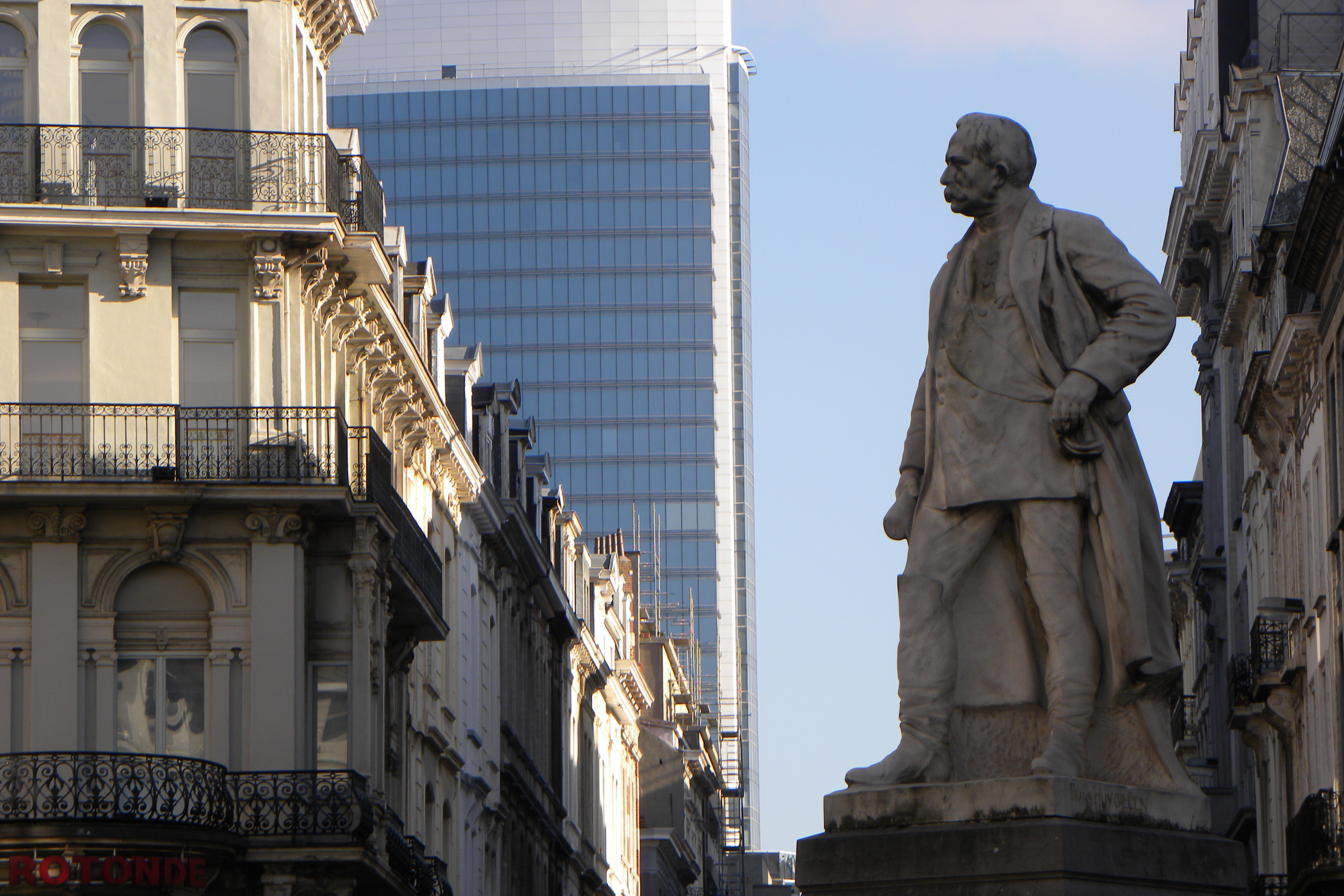
Statue of Brialmont in central Brussels

From his early career, Brialmont advocated expanding the importance of the Belgian army. In 1850, he convinced his father to resign his ministerial post rather than consent to a lowering of defence spending. His stance put him into conflict with Walthère Frère-Orban and the Liberals. From 1855, he began campaigning for restructuring of the defenses of the crucial port city of Antwerp in north-east Belgium. Despite being officially warned off the politically unpopular project, he continued. In the mid 1850s, he published a series of pamphlets arguing for the reorganization and expansion of the tiny Belgian navy, which he believed could be used for imperialist purposes projecting Belgian influence abroad.

Although King Leopold I was deeply opposed to Brialmont's plans, his son Leopold, Duke of Brabant (the future King Leopold II) was impressed by his ideas and the two corresponded frequently. Brialmont felt that colonial expansion was essential to make Belgium a world power, and was an energetic supporter of Leopold II's Congo Free State, which he even helped to found, from the 1880s. Nevertheless, Brialmont refused the offer of becoming Leopold II's aide-de-camp.

In the aftermath of the Franco-Prussian War, Brialmont became an advocate for the abolition of the Remplacement system of conscription and the adoption of a form of universal military service.

=== Political and historical writings ===
Brialmont was an energetic writer on military and political subjects. In 1851, he published his first major work, entitled Considérations politiques et militaires sur la Belgique, which was well received. He wrote a number of books on fortifications including La Fortification du temps présent (1885), Influence du tir plongeant et des obus-torpilles sur la fortification (1888), Les Régions fortifiées (1890), La Défense des états et la fortification à la fin du XIX^{e} siècle (1895) and Progrès de la défense des états et de la fortification permanente depuis Vauban (1898). In 1872, he created the newspaper La Belgique Militaire. He also wrote a number of historical works, including an account of the campaigns of the Duke of Wellington.

== Fortress design ==
Classic Brialmont fortress designs
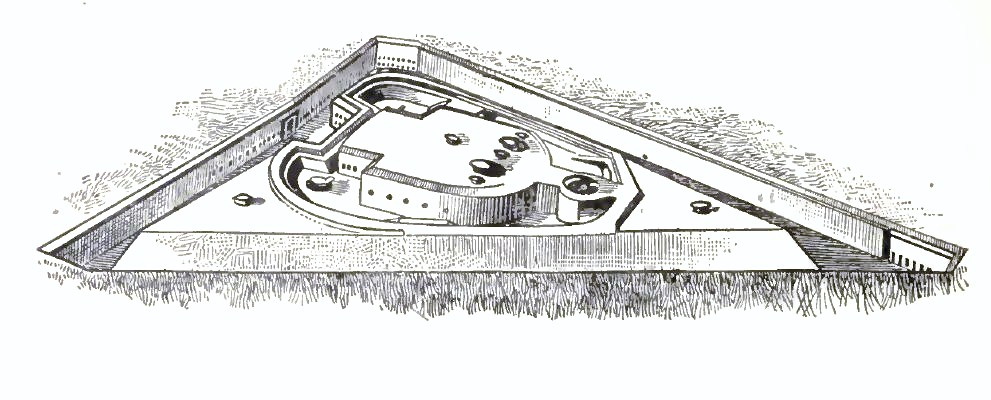
Triangular design

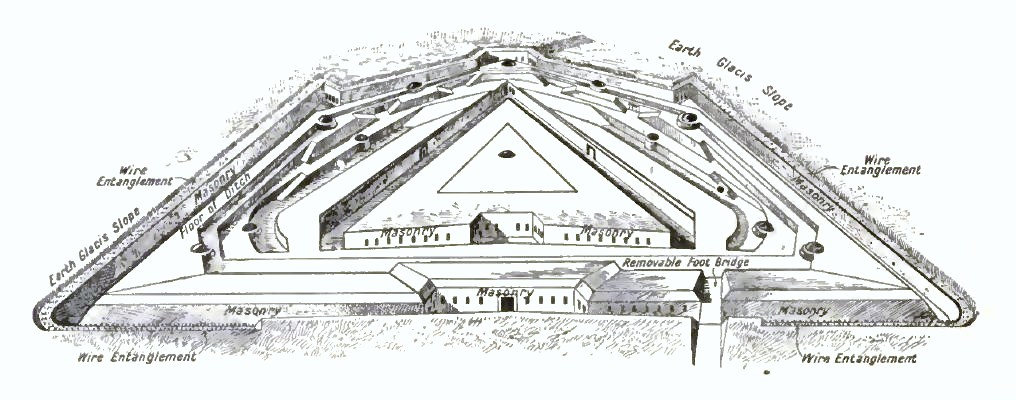
Trapezoid design

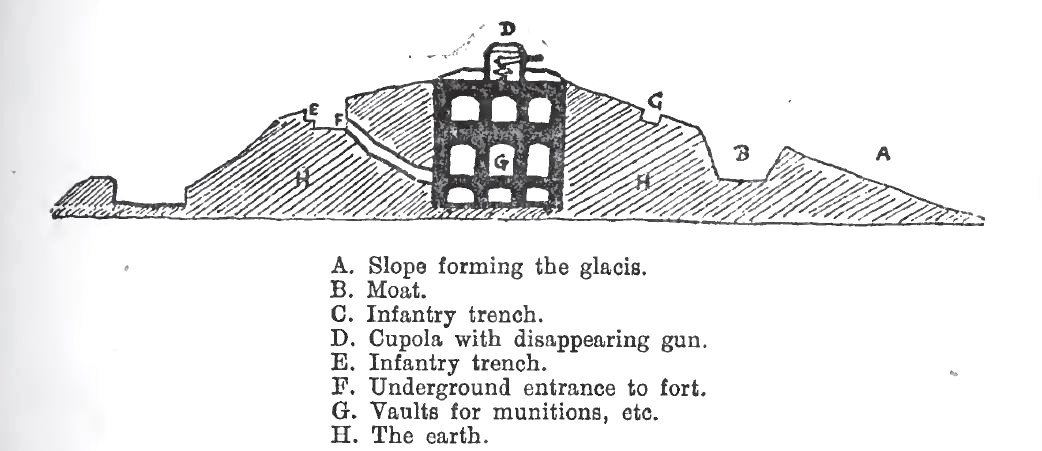
Cross-section

As a result of Brialmont's lobbying, Belgium undertook an ambitious programme of fortress design between 1887 and 1892. In addition to forts built at Antwerp after 1859 on Brialmont's instructions, twelve new forts were built at Liège and nine in Namur.

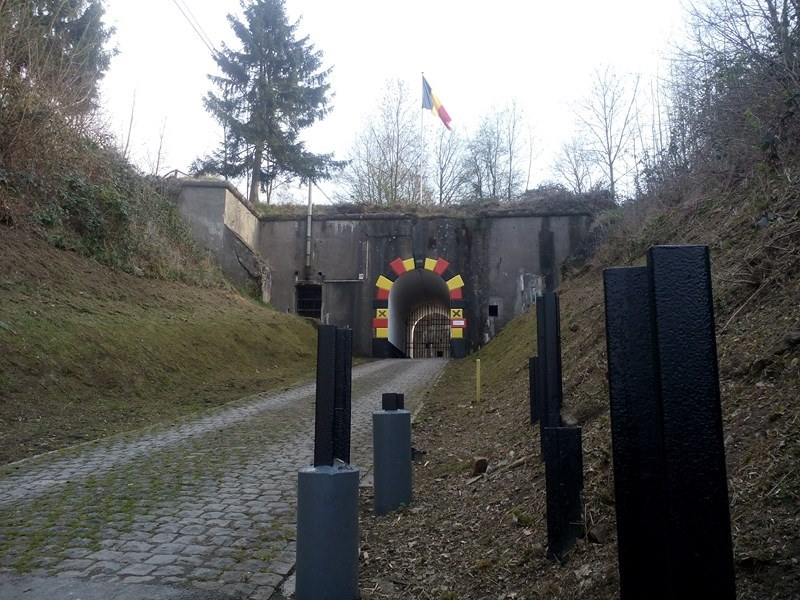
The entrance to the Fort d'Embourg, near Liège, which was designed by Brialmont and built between 1881 and 1884

Brialmont believed that, in order to protect cities from long-range artillery, it was important to move fortifications several miles outside the city itself. On average the forts he constructed were situated 4 kilometres (2.5 mi) outside the settlement they were intended to defend.

In order to guarantee effective protection, a number of forts distributed around the city's perimeter were required. Using new materials, many of these newer fortifications were built of concrete and incorporated retractable gun cupolas, often based along triangular or trapezoid plans. Because of the need to use specialist workers, the construction process was slow and expensive. He was also an early supporter of using wire entanglements for defensive purposes. In an 1879 pamphlet, he advocated the use of wire barricades against infantry assaults.

The Brialmont forts would be used for the first time after Brialmont's death during the German invasion of Belgium in 1914. The system of fortifications established by Brialmont was at the heart of the ultimately unsuccessful Belgian defensive strategy and led to decisive battles at major fortified regions, including the Battles of Liège, Namur and Antwerp between August and October 1914. Ultimately the fortifications proved ineffective against new, large caliber German siege artillery such as the 420 millimetres (17 in) "Big Bertha" and Austrian 305 millimetres (12.0 in) Model 1911 howitzers.

After the end of the First World War, some of the forts were upgraded and also saw service in the Battle of Belgium in May 1940.

=== Romania ===
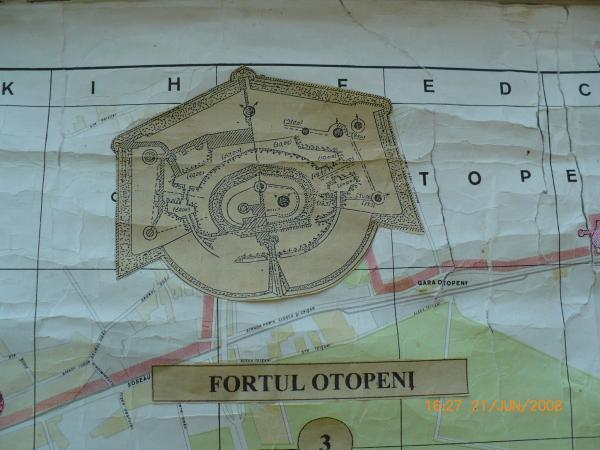
Plan of Fort 3 Otopeni

In 1882, Brialmont was commissioned by King Carol I of Romania to design a series of fortifications to protect the new Kingdom of Romania (which received its independence from the Ottoman Empire in 1877) against invasion and to enhance the status of its new capital, Bucharest. Brialmont was refused permission by the Belgian government to visit Romania in his official capacity and instead went to Romania as a private citizen. Work on the ring of 18 forts around Bucharest began in 1883 and lasted until 1900. On his return he was accused by Frère-Orban of having endangered Belgian neutrality.

While the Bucharest fortifications never served their intended defensive purpose, they were a major influence on the subsequent development and urban planning of the city. The routes constructed to link the forts served as the basis for the modern Bucharest ring-road.

=== Influence ===
Captain-Commandant Émile Wangermée, one of Brialmont's pupils, was instrumental in the design of the Fort de Shinkakasa (built 1891–94) at Boma in the Congo Free State. The fort, based on those designed by Brialmont at the Meuse, was designed to house coastal artillery to protect the Congo River, the main artery in Leopold II's personal colony, against Portuguese encroachment. The fort was the site of a significant mutiny in 1900.
