= Fort d'Andoy =

- Part of Fortifications of Namur
- Andoy, Belgium
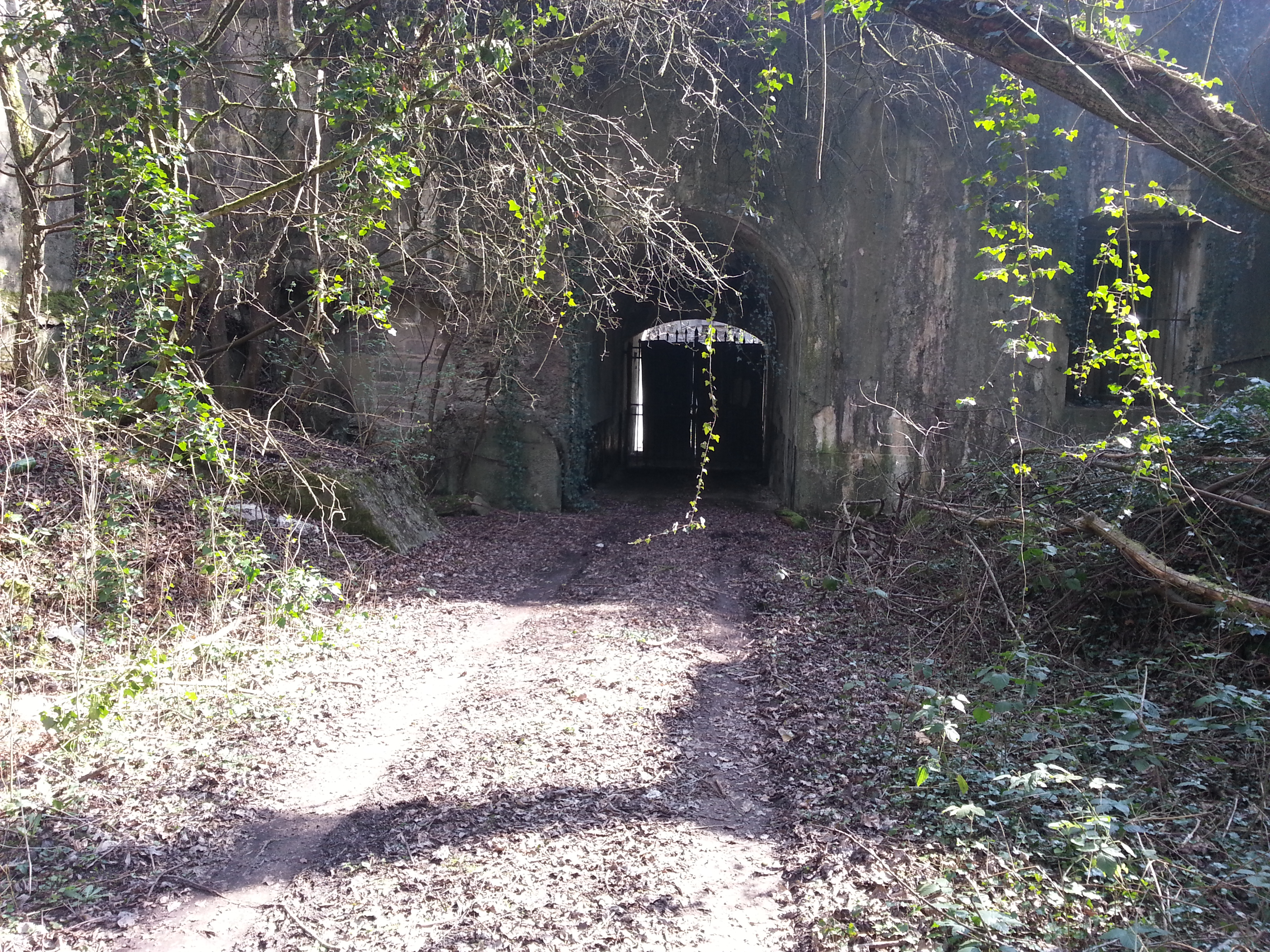
- The fort entrance in 2014

Site information
- Type: Fort
- Owner: Private
- Controlled by: Belgium
- Open to the public: No
- Condition: Abandoned

Location
- Coordinates: 50.44118°N 4.94176°E

Site history
- Built: 1888
- Materials: Unreinforced concrete
- Battles/wars: Battle of Namur, Battle of Belgium

The Fort d'Andoy is one of nine forts built as part of the Fortifications of Namur in the late 19th century in Belgium. It was built between 1888 and 1892 according to the plans of General Henri Alexis Brialmont. Contrasting with the French forts built in the same era by Raymond Adolphe Séré de Rivières, the fort was built exclusively of unreinforced concrete, a new material, rather than masonry. In 1914 the fort was heavily bombarded by German artillery in the Battle of Namur. Andoy was upgraded in the 1930s to become part of the fortified position of Namur in an attempt to forestall or slow an attack from Germany. It saw action in 1940 during the Battle of Belgium, and was captured by German forces. The fort is now abandoned on private property.

== Description ==
The Fort d'Andoy is located about 6 kilometres (3.7 mi) southeast of the center of Namur. The fort forms a triangle in plan, and is one of the larger Namur forts. A 6-metre (20 ft) deep by 8-metre (26 ft) ditch encircles the fort. The ditches were defended in enfilade by 57 mm guns in casemates resembling counterscarp batteries, firing at shot traps at the other end of the ditch. The principal armament was concentrated in the central massif, closely grouped in a solid mass of concrete.

Belgian forts made little provision for the daily needs of their wartime garrisons, locating latrines, showers, kitchens and the morgue in the fort's counterscarp, a location that would be untenable in combat. This would have profound effects on the forts' ability to endure a long assault. The service areas were placed directly opposite the barracks, which opened into the ditch in the rear of the fort (i.e., in the face towards Namur), with lesser protection than the front and "salient" sides. The Brialmont forts placed a weaker side to the rear to allow for recapture by Belgian forces from the rear, and located the barracks and support facilities on this side, using the rear ditch for light and ventilation of living spaces. In combat heavy shellfire made the rear ditch untenable, and German forces were able to get between the forts and attack them from the rear. The Brialmont forts were designed to be protected from shellfire equaling their heaviest guns: 21cm. The top of the central massif used 4 metres (13 ft) of unreinforced concrete, while the caserne walls, judged to be less exposed, used 1.5 metres (4.9 ft). Under fire, the forts were damaged by 21cm fire and could not withstand heavier artillery.

== Armament ==
Andoy's guns included one twin 15cm turret, two single 21 cm turrets and two twin 12cm turrets, all for distant targets. Four 57mm turrets with another eight 57mm guns in embrasures providing defense of the fort's ditches and postern. The fort also mounted an observation turret with a searchlight.

The fort's heavy guns were German, typically Krupp, while the turret mechanisms were from a variety of sources. The fort was provided with signal lights to permit communication with neighboring forts. The guns were fired using black powder rather than smokeless powder, producing choking gas in the confined firing spaces that spread throughout the fort.

== First World War ==
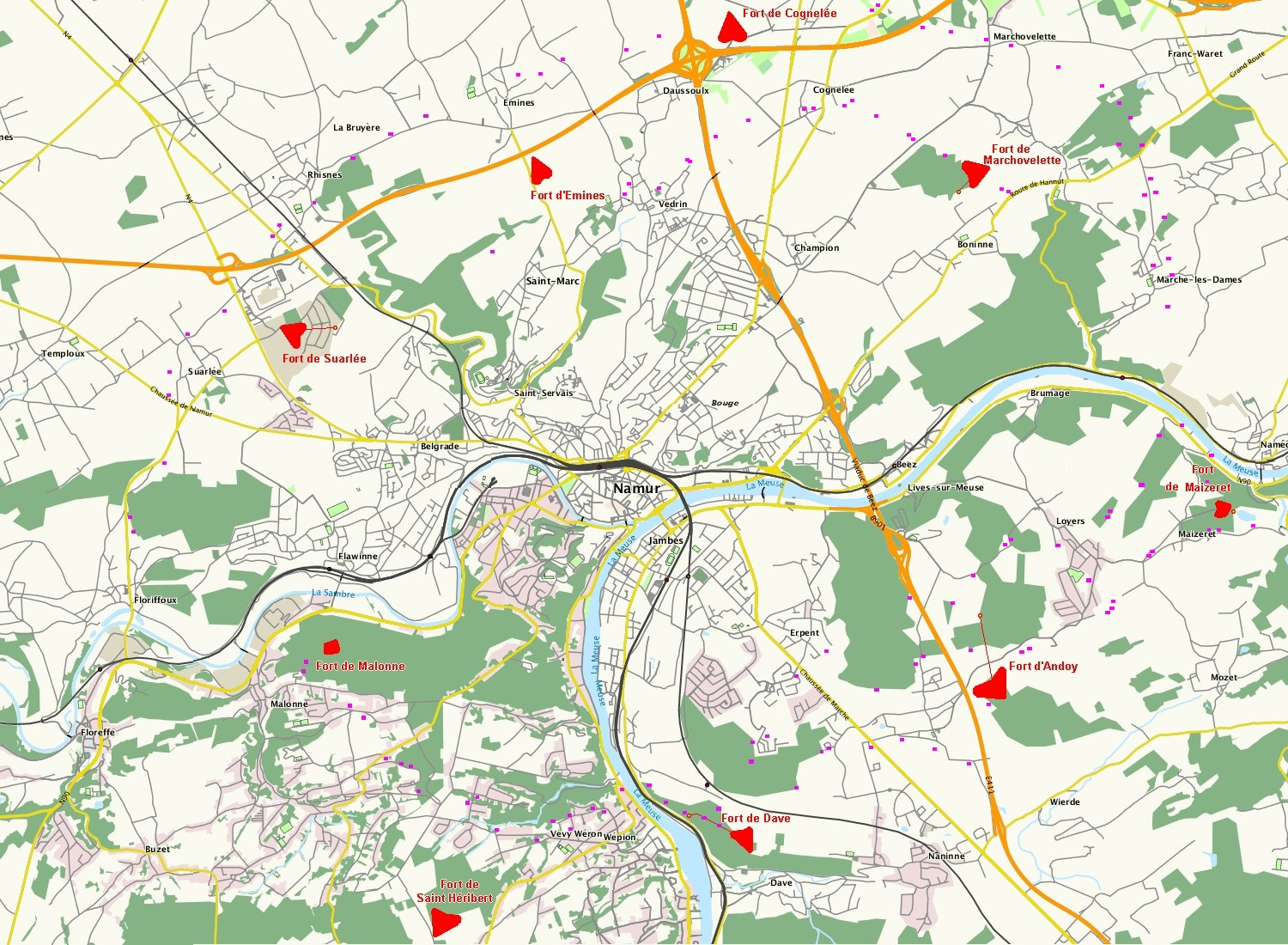
The forts of Namur

Andoy fired its first shots of World War I on 14 August 1914. German fire first hit the fort on 21 August. Andoy was heavily targeted by German artillery from 22 August to 24 August 1914, hit by an estimated 450 to 600 305mm projectiles. The Germans did not bother with infantry assault at the Namur forts as had been tried at Liège, at a heavy cost, preferring to batter the Namur positions with artillery. The Namur forts fell quickly. Andoy was hit in the kitchen and magazine on the 21st, damaging their overhead protection. The 15 cm turret and on 57mm turret were put out of action. The utility plant was damaged on the 22nd, killing Lieutenant Tasnier and five or six soldiers. Heavy damage caused panic in the garrison, but the fort continued to hold out with help from supporting infantry. Andoy's remaining armament fired on German positions on the 23rd, but the 21cm turret was destroyed, killing seven, followed by the destruction of two more turrets. The utility plant was knocked out entirely, leaving the fort with no electricity or ventilation, and the air quickly became unbreathable. Artillery fire stopped in the afternoon of the 23rd, and the interval troops and three functioning 57mm turrets repelled a German infantry assault. Shelling resumed during the night. On the 24th, with the ceiling of the main assembly hall threatening to collapse. Commandant Nollet assembled his 215 remaining men, sabotaged his last functioning armament and surrendered at 1115 hours to the 11th Battalion of the German 32nd Infantry.

The Germans occupied the fort from 1914 to 1918. In 1915 the Germans undertook an improvement program for Andoy and other Namur positions, remedying some of their faults. By 1916 the fort's latrines and bakery had been moved for better protection, the postern and main entry were reinforced, and ventilation had been substantially improved. The fort's concrete was augmented with additional material and metal supports.

== Fortified Position of Namur ==
Andoy's armament was upgraded in the 1930s to become part of the Fortified Position of Namur, which was planned to deter a German incursion over the nearby border. Protection was substantially increased and armament was modernized. This was accompanied by improvements to ventilation, protection, sanitary facilities, communications and electrical power. Four 57mm turrets were re-equipped with 75mm guns, and new guns were mounted in the other cupolas, except for the 21cm turrets, which were not re-used. A 14-metre (46 ft) ventilation tower was added at the end of a 1,200-metre (3,900 ft) tunnel, that could serve as an observation post for spotting artillery fire. The area surrounding the fort was equipped with improved shelters for the interval troops.

== Second World War ==
In May 1940 the Fort d'Andoy was commanded by Commandant Degehet. Following the opening of hostilities between Belgium and Germany, the fort fired on German aircraft without effect. German troops approached on the 13th, taking fire from the fort. Heavier forces, including armored vehicles, approached on the 14th. In the 15th the supporting infantry was ordered to retreat. That afternoon the Germans began to take control of Namur. The fort's air tower took fire from light artillery. Heavier combat took place the next day, and firing became general by the 16th. On the 18th Andoy fired in support of the Fort de Marchovelette, but Marchevolette surrendered at 2000 hours. On the 21st the Fort de Saint-Héribert and the Fort de Malonne requested support. Andoy fired its 75mm guns on the distressed forts, but they were overrun. On the 22nd German forces began a sustained attack on Andoy, supported by 88mm high-velocity guns. The Fort de Maizeret and the Fort de Dave fired on Andoy in support of the defenders, successfully repelling the initial assault. Some of the observation positions were destroyed by German fire, but enough remained in operation to allow coordination with the neighboring forts.

Maizeret and Andoy were attacked on the 23rd. Dave supported the two forts, who supported each other. The garrison noted that the fort's eclipsing turrets could not rise fast enough to avoid being hit by 37mm anti-tank guns before they could fire. The attack intensified so that the turrets and observation cupolas could not be occupied. Saint-Héribert, Maizeret and Malonne surrendered, and Andoy's armament was reduced to one 75mm gun and a grenade launcher turret. The Germans delivered an ultimatum under a flag of truce, demanding the surrender of the fort and threatening aerial bombardment. Andoy's remaining weapons were sabotaged and the fort was surrendered by Commandant Degehet at 1730, receiving military honors from the Germans. The garrison was taken into custody and sent to prisoner of war camps in East Prussia. There were a total of four Belgian dead at Andoy. More than 300 Germans had been killed or wounded in the actions of May around the fort.

== Present ==
The Fort d'Andoy is on private property and is not open to the public. It was never repaired or rehabilitated after World War II. It is used as a hunting ground and is in poor condition, overgrown with vegetation.

== Bibliography ==
- Donnell, Clayton, The Forts of the Meuse in World War I, Osprey Publishing, Oxford, 2007, ISBN 978-1-84603-114-4.
- Kauffmann, J.E., Jurga, R., Fortress Europe: European Fortifications of World War II, Da Capo Press, USA, 2002, ISBN 0-306-81174-X.
