= Fort de Saint-Héribert =

19th-century fort in Belgium

- Part of Fortifications of Namur
- Wépion, Belgium
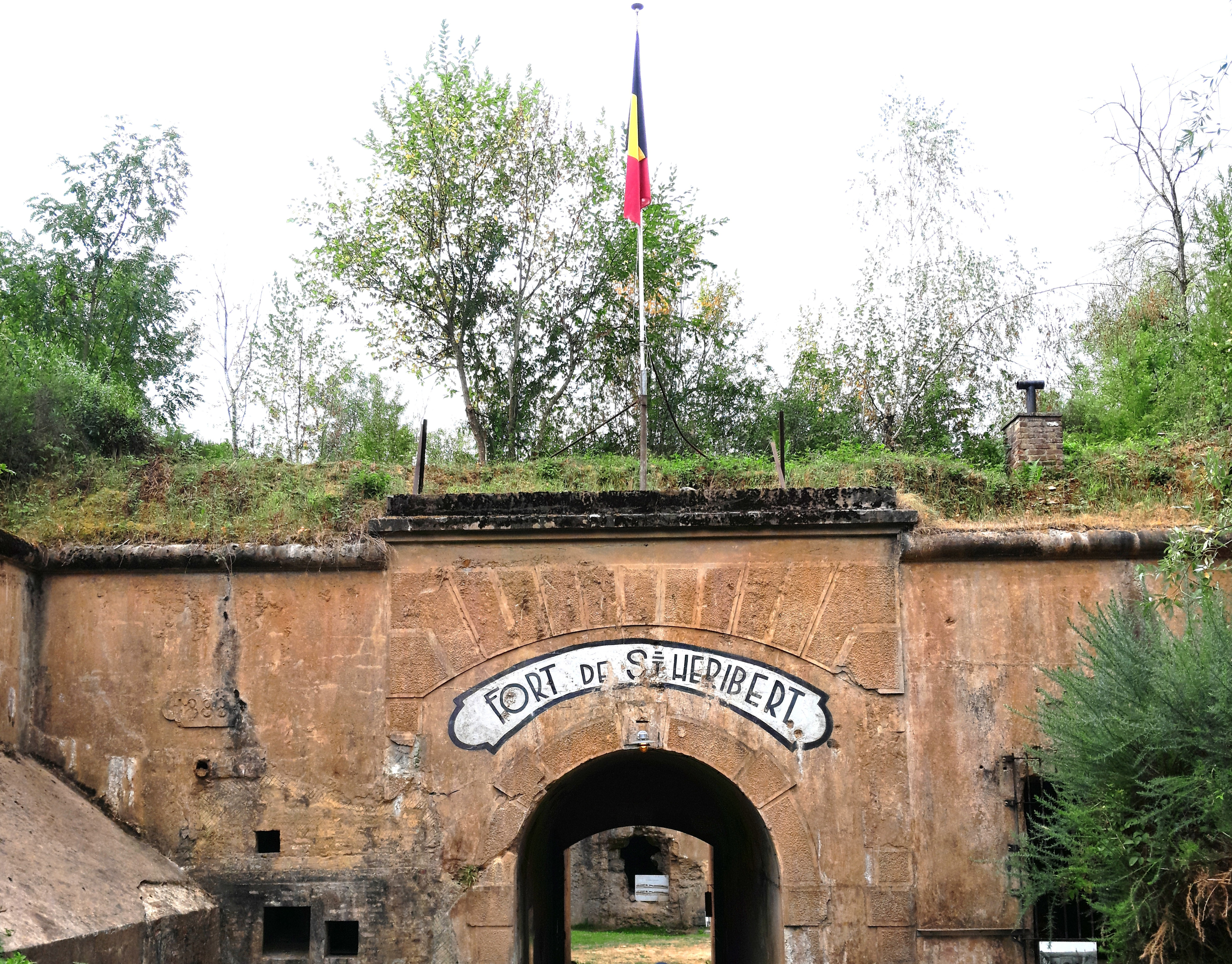

Site information
- Type: Fort
- Owner: Fondation "Emile Legros"
- Controlled by: Fondation "Emile Legros"
- Condition: Being rehabilitated

Location
- Location within Belgium
- Coordinates: 50.41356°N 4.83231°E

Site history
- Built: 1888-1892
- Materials: Unreinforced concrete
- Battles/wars: Battle of Namur, Battle of Belgium

Garrison information
- Past commanders: Capitaine L'Entrée (1940)
- Garrison: 400 (1914), 160 (1940)

The Fort de St-Héribert or the Fort de Wépion is one of nine forts built as part of the Fortifications of Namur in the late 19th century in Belgium. It was built between 1888 and 1892 according to the plans of General Henri Alexis Brialmont. Contrasting with the French forts built in the same era by Raymond Adolphe Séré de Rivières, the fort was built exclusively of unreinforced concrete, a new material, rather than masonry. In 1914 the fort was heavily bombarded by German artillery in the Battle of Namur. Maizeret was upgraded in the 1930s to become part of the fortified position of Namur in an attempt to forestall or slow an attack from Germany. It saw action in 1940 during the Battle of Belgium, and was captured by German forces. The fort now belongs to the private Fondation Emile Legros. The foundation has already unearthed the main entrance and other areas.

== Description ==
The Fort de St-Héribert is located about 6 kilometres (3.7 mi) south of the center of Namur. The fort, one of the larger Brialmont forts, is a triangle. A 6-metre (20 ft) deep by 8-metre (26 ft) ditch encircles the fort. The ditches were defended in enfilade by 57 mm guns in casemates resembling counterscarp batteries, firing at shot traps at the other end of the ditch. The principal armament was concentrated in the central massif, closely grouped in a solid mass of concrete.

Belgian forts made little provision for the daily needs of their wartime garrisons, locating latrines, showers, kitchens and the morgue in the fort's counterscarp, a location that would be untenable in combat. This would have profound effects on the forts' ability to endure a long assault. The service areas were placed directly opposite the barracks, which opened into the ditch in the rear of the fort (i.e., in the face towards Namur), with lesser protection than the front and "salient" sides. The Brialmont forts placed a weaker side to the rear to allow for recapture by Belgian forces from the rear, and located the barracks and support facilities on this side, using the rear ditch for light and ventilation of living spaces. In combat heavy shellfire made the rear ditch untenable, and German forces were able to get between the forts and attack them from the rear. The Brialmont forts were designed to be protected from shellfire equaling their heaviest guns: 21 cm. The top of the central massif used 4 metres (13 ft) of unreinforced concrete, while the caserne walls, judged to be less exposed, used 1.5 metres (4.9 ft). Under fire, the forts were damaged by 21 cm fire and could not withstand heavier artillery.

== Armament ==
Saint-Héribert's guns included one twin 15 cm turret, two single 21 cm turrets and two twin 12 cm turrets, all for distant targets. Four 57mm turrets with another nine 57mm guns in embrasures providing defense of the fort's ditches and postern. The fort also mounted an observation turret with a searchlight.

The fort's heavy guns were German, typically Krupp, while the turret mechanisms were from a variety of sources. The fort was provided with signal lights to permit communication with neighboring forts. The guns were fired using black powder rather than smokeless powder, producing choking gas in the confined firing spaces that spread throughout the fort.

== World War I ==
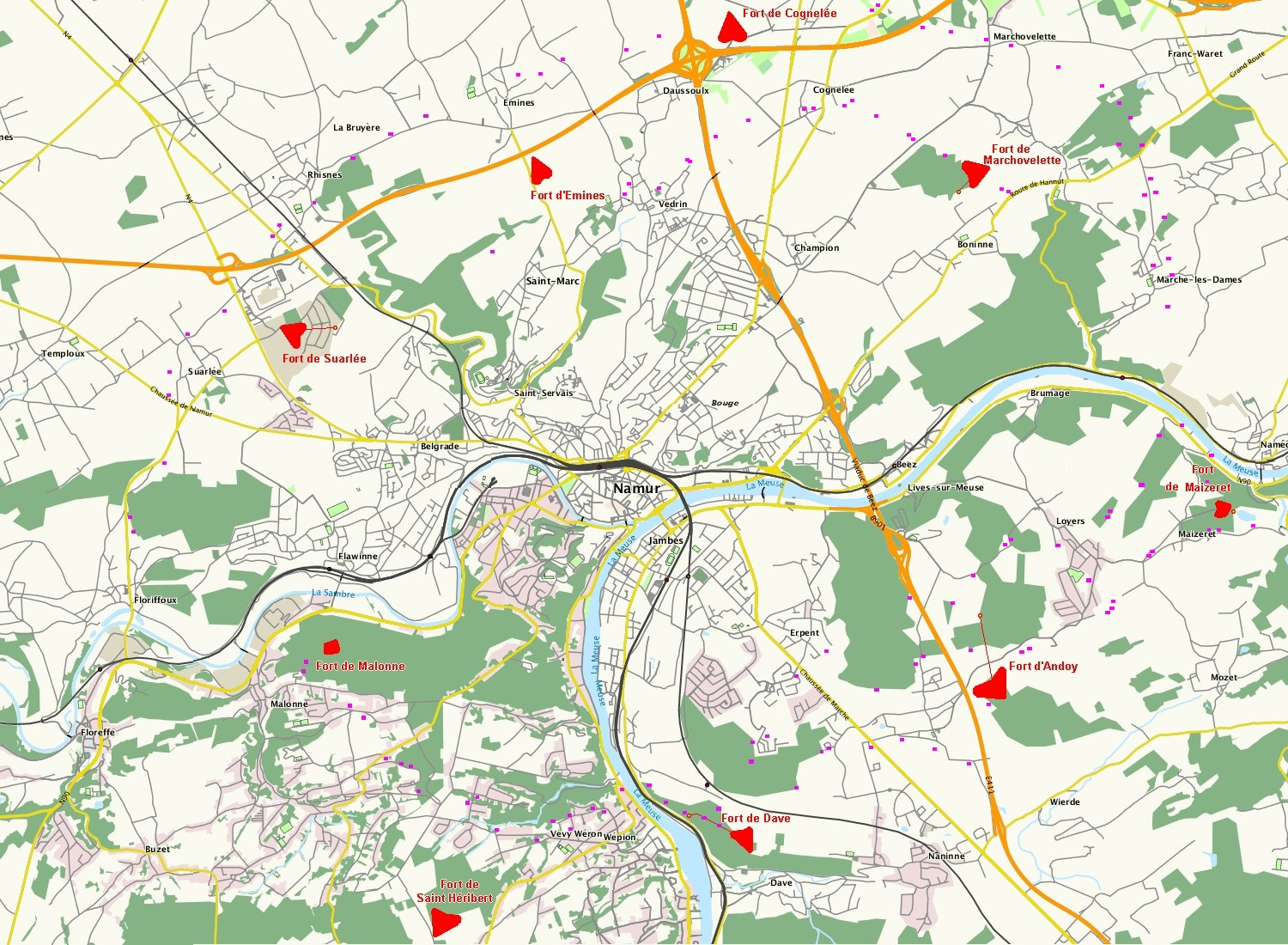
The forts of Namur

In the summer of 1914 the Fort de Saint-Héribert was under the command of Captain-Commandant Derzellez, with about 400 artillerymen and 80 fortress troops. The fort was bombarded by invading German forces beginning on 21 August 1914. The Germans did not bother with infantry assault at the Namur forts as had been tried at Liège, at a heavy cost, preferring to batter the Namur positions with artillery. The Namur forts fell quickly. Telephone contact with the outside was lost on 23 August, the same day that the infantry in the intervals between the forts were withdrawn. The fort repelled an infantry attack early on the 24th, but took heavy German fire from 1530 to 1945. At 2100 the garrison surrendered, while the Germans continued to fire around them to prevent their escape.

== Fortified Position of Namur ==
Saint-Héribert's armament was upgraded in the 1930s to become part of the Fortified Position of Namur, which was planned to deter a German incursion over the nearby border. Protection was substantially increased and armament was modernized. This was accompanied by improvements to ventilation, protection, sanitary facilities, communications and electrical power. The area surrounding the fort was equipped with improved shelters for the interval troops.

After its renovation, Saint-Héribert was armed with one twin 75mm turret, four retractable 75mm single turrets, two twin machine gun turrets and a number of observation cloches. Machine guns provided close protection. Ventilation was provided by an air inlet in a nearby ravine. Six anti-aircraft guns were installed as well.

== Second World War ==
The Fort de Saint-Héribert in May 1940 was commanded by Captain-Commandant :L'Entrée with about 400 men. It started firing on nearby German forces early on 15 May at an initial rate of 50 shots per hour from the 75mm guns, increasing to 75 shots per hour, then 120. The same day the supporting infantry was withdrawn and the fort was on its own. The fort came under aerial attack in the afternoon. The 16th and 17th were quiet, but on the 18th the fort came under heavy bombardment, returning harassing fire from the fort's 75mm guns, which had so far been unaffected by the German fire. On the 19th the fort received damage to its concrete cover, but was able to use direct fire against enemy observation stations in the neighborhood. German fire intensified on the 20th, causing damage. During the early hours of the 21st German patrols began moving in the woods nearby under the cover of smoke bombs. The fort was encircled during daylight hours, but received supporting fire from the Fort d'Andoy, Fort de Malonne and the Fort de Dave. Nevertheless, German artillery was placed within 500 metres of the fort, destroying each turret in turn. The fort continued to resist with machine guns in the ditches, but the fort lost electric power at midday. After sabotaging their remaining weapons and destroying documents, the garrison surrendered at 12:10. The fort suffered one dead, while the Germans had 129 dead and 602 wounded, primarily from the 317th Infantry Regiment.

== Present ==
The Fort de Saint-Héribert is on private property. It was never repaired or rehabilitated after World War II.
Since 2013, the Fondation Emile Legros has begun to restore the fort and it is open for visits. (See website of the Fort Saint Héribert)

== Bibliography ==
- Donnell, Clayton, The Forts of the Meuse in World War I, Osprey Publishing, Oxford, 2007, ISBN 978-1-84603-114-4.
- Kauffmann, J.E., Jurga, R., Fortress Europe: European Fortifications of World War II, Da Capo Press, USA, 2002, ISBN 0-306-81174-X.
