= Fort d'Emines =

- Part of Fortifications of Namur
- Émines, Belgium
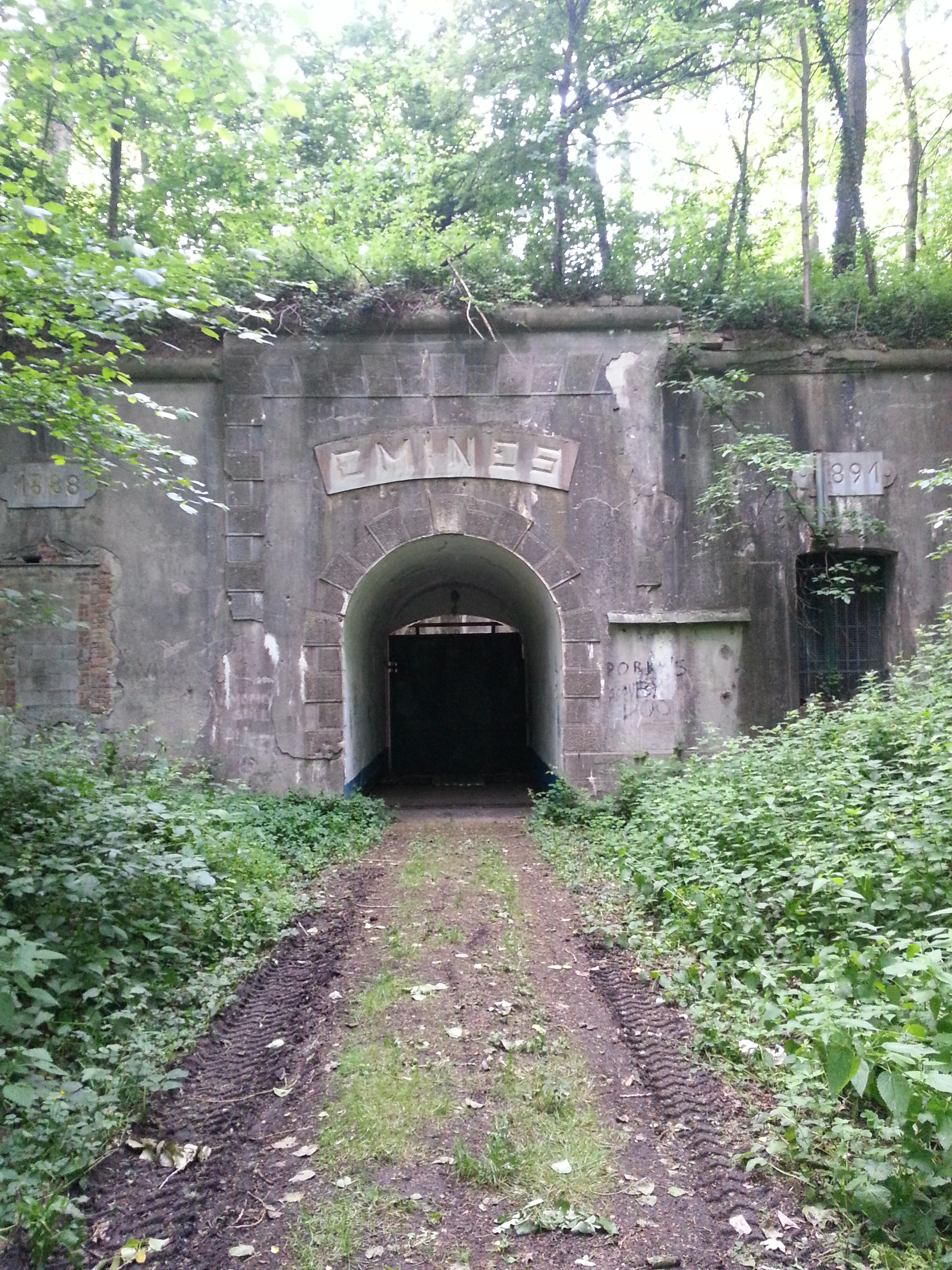

Site information
- Type: Fort
- Owner: Private
- Controlled by: Belgium
- Open to the public: No
- Condition: Abandoned

Location
- Coordinates: 50.50661°N 4.85003°E

Site history
- Built: 1888
- Materials: Unreinforced concrete
- Battles/wars: Battle of Namur, Battle of Belgium

The Fort d'Emines is one of nine forts built as part of the Fortifications of Namur in the late 19th century in Belgium. It was built between 1888 and 1892 according to the plans of General Henri Alexis Brialmont. Contrasting with the French forts built in the same era by Raymond Adolphe Séré de Rivières, the fort was built exclusively of unreinforced concrete, a new material, rather than masonry. In 1914 the fort was heavily bombarded by German artillery in the Battle of Namur. Unlike seven of the nine Namur forts, Émines was never upgraded to become part of the fortified position of Namur. Instead, it became a supply and munitions depot. The fort is now abandoned on private property.

== Description ==
The Fort d'Emines is located about 5 kilometres (3.1 mi) north of the center of Namur. The fort, one of the smaller Brialmont forts, is a triangle. A 6-metre (20 ft) deep by 8-metre (26 ft) ditch encircles the fort. The ditches were defended in enfilade by 57 mm guns in casemates resembling counterscarp batteries, firing at shot traps at the other end of the ditch. The principal armament was concentrated in the central massif, closely grouped in a solid mass of concrete. Emines was designed to cover the gap between the Fort de Suarlée and the Fort de Cognelée, as well as the road and train line from Namur to Wavre.

Belgian forts made little provision for the daily needs of their wartime garrisons, locating latrines, showers, kitchens and the morgue in the fort's counterscarp, a location that would be untenable in combat. This would have profound effects on the forts' ability to endure a long assault. The service areas were placed directly opposite the barracks, which opened into the ditch in the rear of the fort (i.e., in the face towards Namur), with lesser protection than the front and "salient" sides. The Brialmont forts placed a weaker side to the rear to allow for recapture by Belgian forces from the rear, and located the barracks and support facilities on this side, using the rear ditch for light and ventilation of living spaces. In combat heavy shellfire made the rear ditch untenable, and German forces were able to get between the forts and attack them from the rear. The Brialmont forts were designed to be protected from shellfire equaling their heaviest guns: 21 cm. The top of the central massif used 4 metres (13 ft) of unreinforced concrete, while the caserne walls, judged to be less exposed, used 1.5 metres (4.9 ft). Under fire, the forts were damaged by 21 cm fire and could not withstand heavier artillery.

== Armament ==
Emines's guns included one twin 15 cm turret, one single 21 cm turret and two single 12 cm turrets, all for distant targets. Three 57mm turrets with another six 57mm guns in embrasures providing defense of the fort's ditches and postern. The fort also mounted an observation turret with a searchlight.

The fort's heavy guns were German, typically Krupp, while the turret mechanisms were from a variety of sources. The fort was provided with signal lights to permit communication with neighboring forts. The guns were fired using black powder rather than smokeless powder, producing choking gas in the confined firing spaces that spread throughout the fort.

== World War I ==
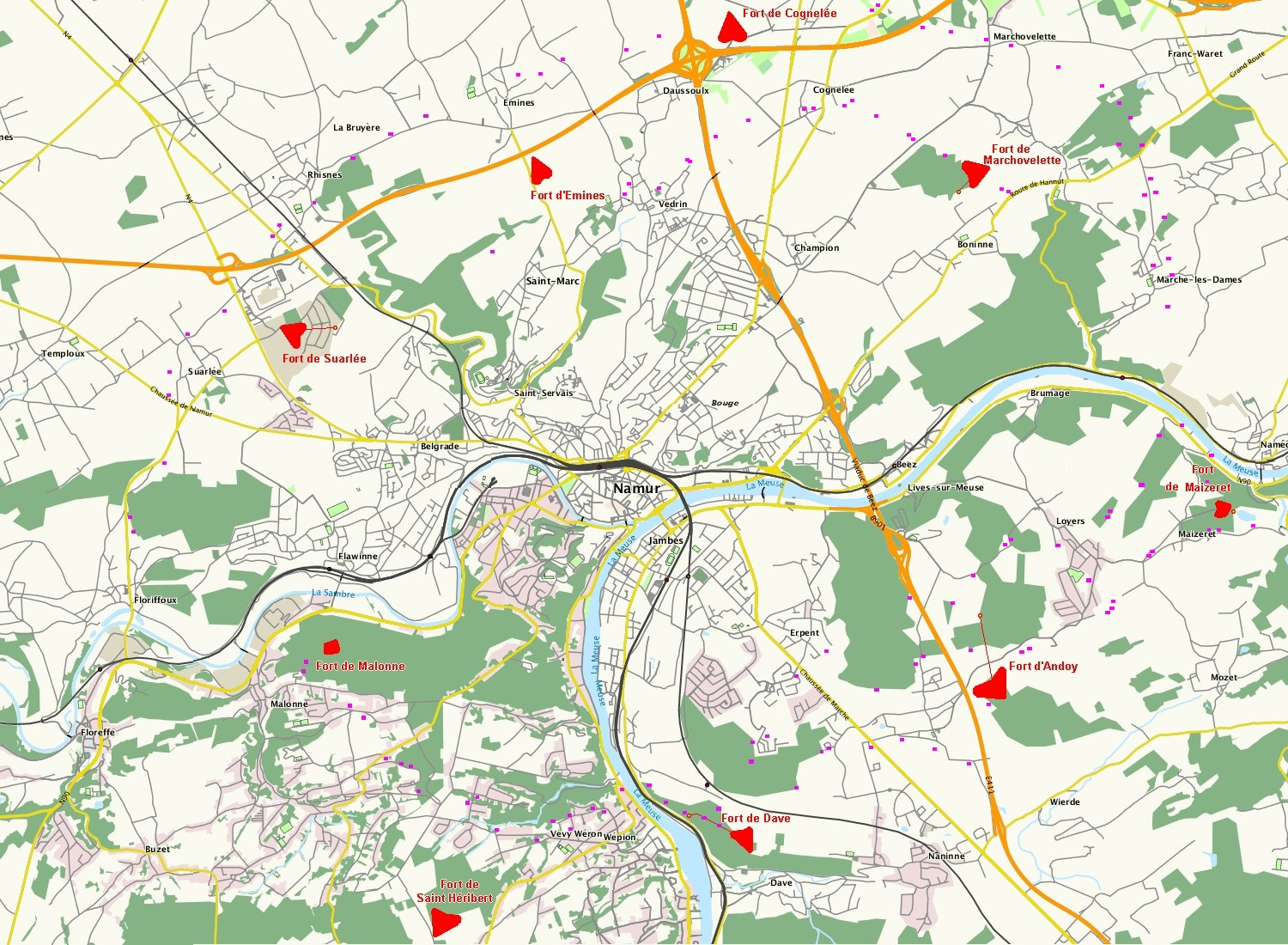
The forts of Namur

In the summer of 1914 the Fort d'Emines was under the command of Captain-Commandant Lallemand, with about 400 men. Emines first fired its weapons on 23 August. It received 15 cm and 21 cm fire in return from German batteries. The bombardment continued through the next day, with conditions growing intolerable within the fort as a result of the approximately 2000 shells that hit the fort. Emines surrendered at 1600 hours, with one dead.

The Germans re-armed Emines and upgraded its protection and habitability with additional concrete and ventilation. A ventilation tunnel was built under the ditch to the opposite side of the counterscarp.

== Fortified Position of Namur ==
Emines's was not chosen to be upgraded in the 1930s. It was instead used as a munitions depot. Two bunkers were built in 1939 and 1940 to provide for local defense with automatic arms.

== Present ==
The Fort d'Emines is on private property and is not open to the public. It was never repaired or rehabilitated after World War II. In an initiative by the Namur tourism it was open for tours on 11 November 2008.

== Bibliography ==
- Donnell, Clayton, The Forts of the Meuse in World War I, Osprey Publishing, Oxford, 2007, ISBN 978-1-84603-114-4.
- Kauffmann, J.E., Jurga, R., Fortress Europe: European Fortifications of World War II, Da Capo Press, USA, 2002, ISBN 0-306-81174-X.
