= Fort de Maizeret =

- Part of Fortifications of Namur
- Maizeret, Belgium

Site information
- Type: Fort
- Owner: Private
- Controlled by: Belgium
- Open to the public: No
- Condition: Abandoned

Location
- Location within Belgium
- Coordinates: 50.46361°N 4.9875°E

Site history
- Built: 1888
- Materials: Unreinforced concrete
- Battles/wars: Battle of Namur, Battle of Belgium

The Fort de Maizeret is one of nine forts built as part of the Fortifications of Namur in the late 19th century in Belgium. It was built between 1888 and 1892 according to the plans of General Henri Alexis Brialmont. Contrasting with the French forts built in the same era by Raymond Adolphe Séré de Rivières, the fort was built exclusively of unreinforced concrete, a new material, rather than masonry. In 1914 the fort was heavily bombarded by German artillery in the Battle of Namur. Maizeret was upgraded in the 1930s to become part of the fortified position of Namur in an attempt to forestall or slow an attack from Germany. It saw action in 1940 during the Battle of Belgium, and was captured by German forces. The fort is now abandoned on private property.

== Description ==
The Fort de Maizeret is located about 9 kilometres (5.6 mi) east of the center of Namur. The fort, one of the smaller Brialmont forts, is an irregular trapezoid overlooking a bend in the Meuse. A 6-metre (20 ft) deep by 8-metre (26 ft) ditch encircles the fort. The ditches were defended in enfilade by 57 mm guns in casemates resembling counterscarp batteries, firing at shot traps at the other end of the ditch. The principal armament was concentrated in the central massif, closely grouped in a solid mass of concrete.

Belgian forts made little provision for the daily needs of their wartime garrisons, locating latrines, showers, kitchens and the morgue in the fort's counterscarp, a location that would be untenable in combat. This would have profound effects on the forts' ability to endure a long assault. The service areas were placed directly opposite the barracks, which opened into the ditch in the rear of the fort (i.e., in the face towards Namur), with lesser protection than the front and "salient" sides. The Brialmont forts placed a weaker side to the rear to allow for recapture by Belgian forces from the rear, and located the barracks and support facilities on this side, using the rear ditch for light and ventilation of living spaces. In combat heavy shellfire made the rear ditch untenable, and German forces were able to get between the forts and attack them from the rear. The Brialmont forts were designed to be protected from shellfire equaling their heaviest guns: 21cm. The top of the central massif used 4 metres (13 ft) of unreinforced concrete, while the caserne walls, judged to be less exposed, used 1.5 metres (4.9 ft). Under fire, the forts were damaged by 21cm fire and could not withstand heavier artillery.

== Construction ==
The three forts on the right bank of the Meuse were linked by a military railway, with a repair shop for the rolling stock at Maizeret. Materials delivered from the Meuse were moved to Maizeret by an inclined plane from the river below.

== Armament ==
Maizeret's guns included one twin 15cm turret, one single 21cm turret and two twin 12cm turrets, all for distant targets. Three 57mm turrets with another six 57mm guns in embrasures providing defense of the fort's ditches and postern. The fort also mounted an observation turret with a searchlight.

The fort's heavy guns were German, typically Krupp, while the turret mechanisms were from a variety of sources. The fort was provided with signal lights to permit communication with neighboring forts. The guns were fired using black powder rather than smokeless powder, producing choking gas in the confined firing spaces that spread throughout the fort.

== World War I ==
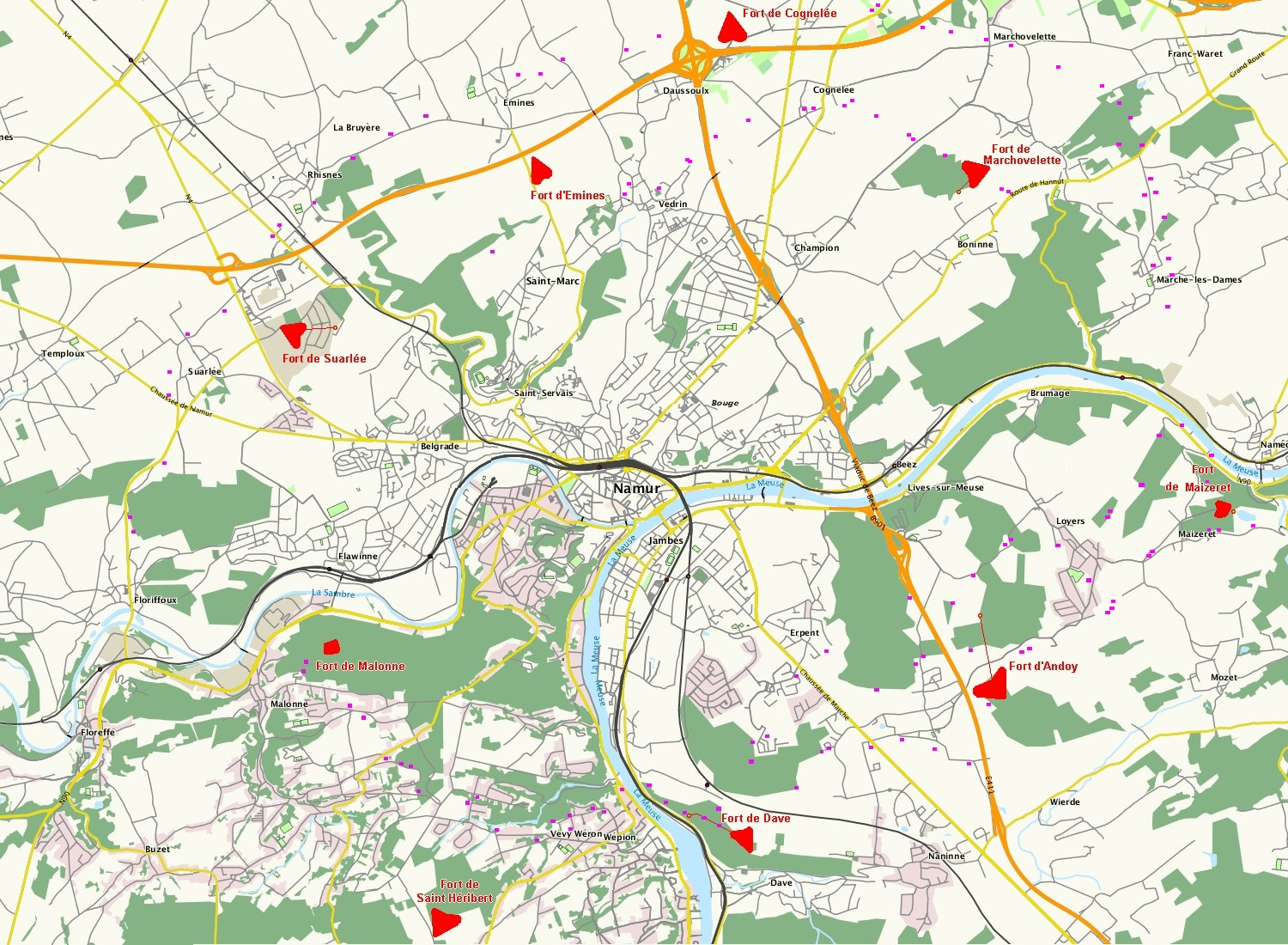
The forts of Namur

In the summer of 1914 the Fort de Maizeret was under the command of Captain-Commandant Poncelet, with about 400 men. The fort was bombarded by invading German forces beginning on 21 August 1914. The Germans did not bother with infantry assault at the Namur forts as had been tried at Liège, at a heavy cost, preferring to batter the Namur positions with artillery. The Namur forts fell quickly. Maizeret was abandoned by Poncelet and his garrison on 22 August, its ability to resist destroyed by the heavy German artillery.

== Fortified Position of Namur ==
Maizeret's armament was upgraded in the 1930s to become part of the Fortified Position of Namur, which was planned to deter a German incursion over the nearby border. Protection was substantially increased and armament was modernized. This was accompanied by improvements to ventilation, protection, sanitary facilities, communications and electrical power. The area surrounding the fort was equipped with improved shelters for the interval troops.

After its renovation, Maizeret was armed with one twin 105mm turret, four 75mm single turrets, one twin machine gun turret and two twin grenade launcher turrets. Machine guns provided close protection. Ventilation was provided by an air inlet in a nearby ravine. The 75mm turrets could be lowered for better protection.

== Second World War ==
The Fort de Maizeret in May 1940 was commanded by Captain-Commandant Hambrenne. The fort opened fire against distant targets on 14 May. On the 15th Maizeret fired in support of the Fort de Marchovelette, but was inactive on the following two days. On the 18th, Maizeret again supported Marchovelette. On the 19th there were skirmishes and two wounded Germans were captured. In the 20th, Maizeret supported the Fort d'Andoy. Sporadic action continued on the 21st and 22nd. On the morning of the 23rd the fort came under heavy fire from 88mm high-velocity guns, followed by an infantry assault. The fort surrendered at 2:45 PM, having lost all means of resistance.

== Present ==
The Fort de Maizeret is on private property and is not open to the public. It was never repaired or rehabilitated after World War II. A quarry has been excavated just to the east of the fort. One of the counterscarp positions is directly on the edge of the quarry, overlooking the Meuse. The present owner lives in the former commandant's house.

== Bibliography ==
- Donnell, Clayton, The Forts of the Meuse in World War I, Osprey Publishing, Oxford, 2007, ISBN 978-1-84603-114-4.
- Kauffmann, J.E., Jurga, R., Fortress Europe: European Fortifications of World War II, Da Capo Press, USA, 2002, ISBN 0-306-81174-X.
