= Fort de Cognelée =

- Part of Fortifications of Namur
- Daussoulx, Belgium
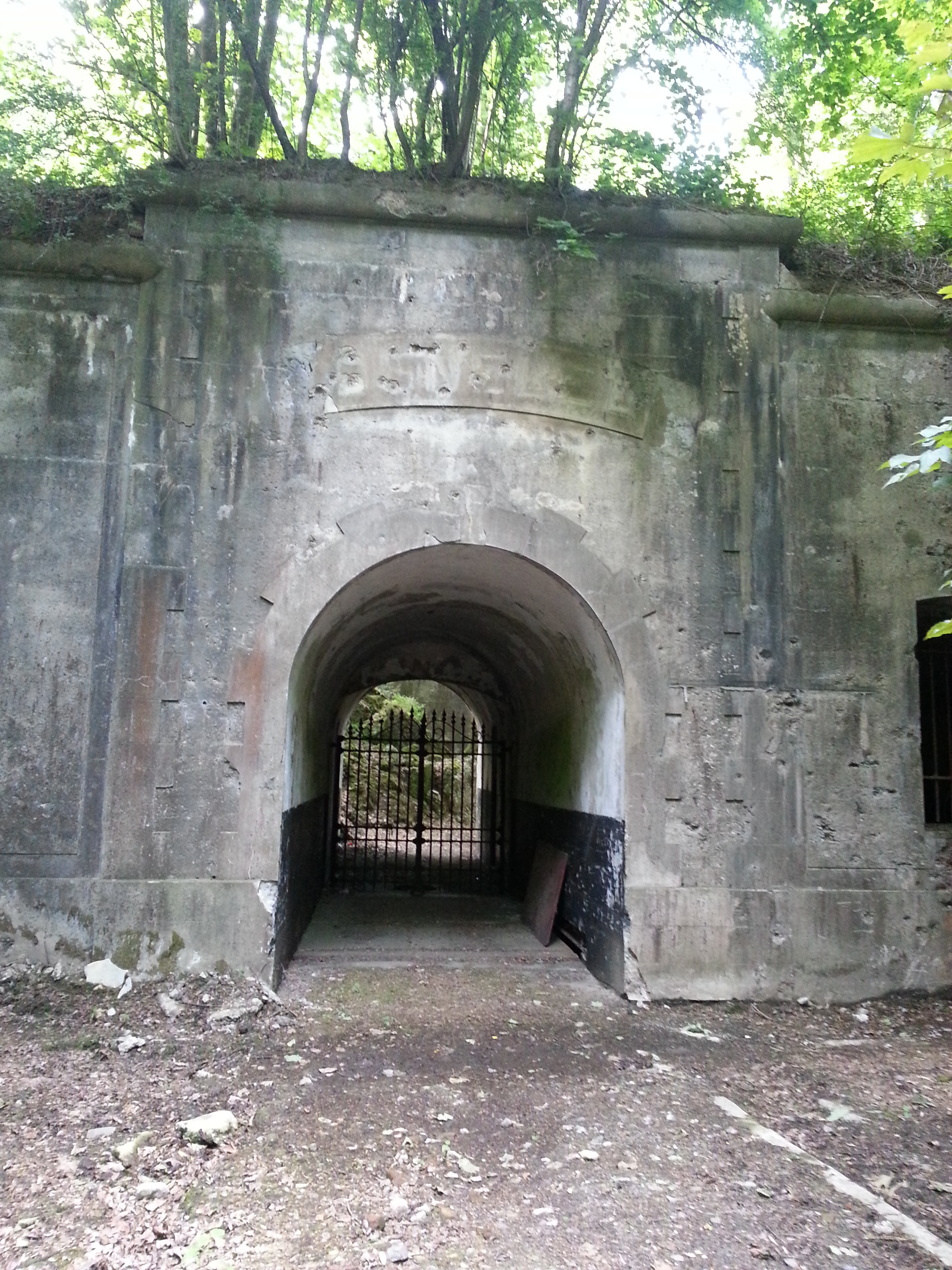

Site information
- Type: Fort
- Owner: Private
- Controlled by: Belgium
- Open to the public: No
- Condition: Abandoned

Location
- Coordinates: 50.52464°N 4.88774°E

Site history
- Built: 1888
- Materials: Unreinforced concrete
- Battles/wars: Battle of Namur, Battle of Belgium

The Fort de Cognelée is one of nine forts built as part of the Fortifications of Namur in the late 19th century in Belgium. It was built between 1888 and 1892 according to the plans of General Henri Alexis Brialmont. Contrasting with the French forts built in the same era by Raymond Adolphe Séré de Rivières, the fort was built exclusively of unreinforced concrete, a new material, rather than masonry. In 1914 the fort was heavily bombarded by German artillery in the Battle of Namur. Unlike seven of the nine Namur forts, Cognelée was never upgraded to become part of the fortified position of Namur. Instead, it became a supply and munitions depot. The fort is now abandoned on private property.

== Description ==
The Fort de Cognelée is located about 5 kilometres (3.1 mi) north of the center of Namur. The fort, one of the larger Brialmont forts, is a triangle. A 6-metre (20 ft) deep by 8-metre (26 ft) ditch encircles the fort. The ditches were defended in enfilade by 57 mm guns in casemates resembling counterscarp batteries, firing at shot traps at the other end of the ditch. The principal armament was concentrated in the central massif, closely grouped in a solid mass of concrete.

Belgian forts made little provision for the daily needs of their wartime garrisons, locating latrines, showers, kitchens and the morgue in the fort's counterscarp, a location that would be untenable in combat. This would have profound effects on the forts' ability to endure a long assault. The service areas were placed directly opposite the barracks, which opened into the ditch in the rear of the fort (i.e., in the face towards Namur), with lesser protection than the front and "salient" sides. The Brialmont forts placed a weaker side to the rear to allow for recapture by Belgian forces from the rear, and located the barracks and support facilities on this side, using the rear ditch for light and ventilation of living spaces. In combat heavy shellfire made the rear ditch untenable, and German forces were able to get between the forts and attack them from the rear. The Brialmont forts were designed to be protected from shellfire equaling their heaviest guns: 21 cm. The top of the central massif used 4 metres (13 ft) of unreinforced concrete, while the caserne walls, judged to be less exposed, used 1.5 metres (4.9 ft). Under fire, the forts were damaged by 21 cm fire and could not withstand heavier artillery.

== Armament ==
Cognelée's guns included one twin 15 cm turret, two single 21 cm turrets and two twin 12 cm turrets, all for distant targets. Four 57mm turrets with another eight 57mm guns in embrasures providing defense of the fort's ditches and postern. The fort also mounted an observation turret with a searchlight.

The fort's heavy guns were German, typically Krupp, while the turret mechanisms were from a variety of sources. The fort was provided with signal lights to permit communication with neighboring forts. The guns were fired using black powder rather than smokeless powder, producing choking gas in the confined firing spaces that spread throughout the fort.

== World War I ==
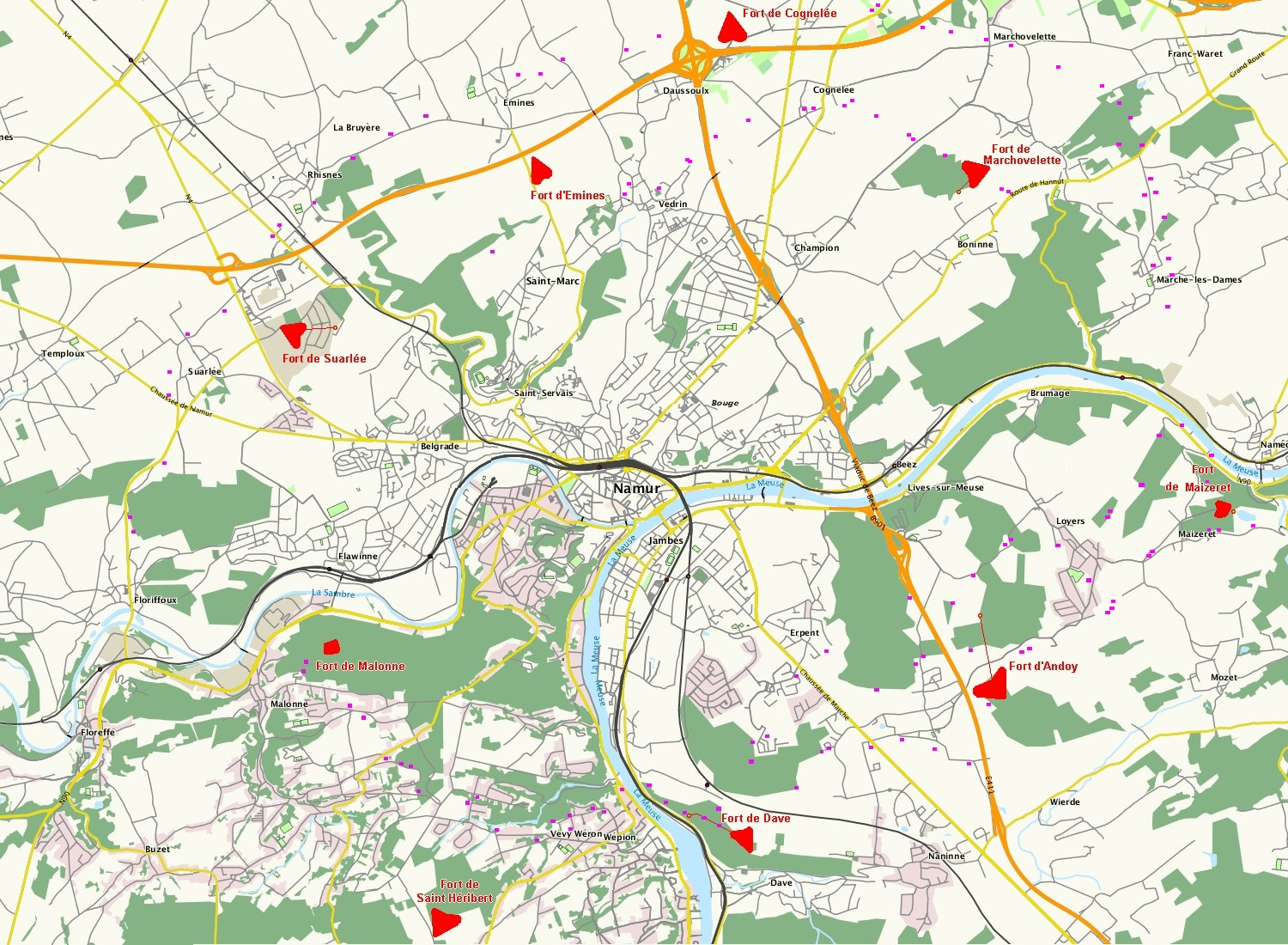
The forts of Namur

Cognelée was heavily bombarded in August 1914 by large-caliber artillery. Cognelée surrendered on 23 August, one of the last of the Namur forts tosurrender.

The Germans re-armed Cognelée and upgraded its protection and habitability with additional concrete and ventilation.

== Fortified Position of Namur ==
Cognelée was not chosen to be upgraded in the 1930s. It was instead used as a munitions depot. Two bunkers were built in 1939 and 1940 to provide for local defense with automatic arms.

== Present ==
The Fort de Cognelée is on private property and is not open to the public. It was never repaired or rehabilitated after World War II.

== Bibliography ==
- Donnell, Clayton, The Forts of the Meuse in World War I, Osprey Publishing, Oxford, 2007, ISBN 978-1-84603-114-4.
- Kauffmann, J.E., Jurga, R., Fortress Europe: European Fortifications of World War II, Da Capo Press, USA, 2002, ISBN 0-306-81174-X.
