= Fort de Suarlée =

- Part of Fortifications of Namur
- Suarlée, Belgium
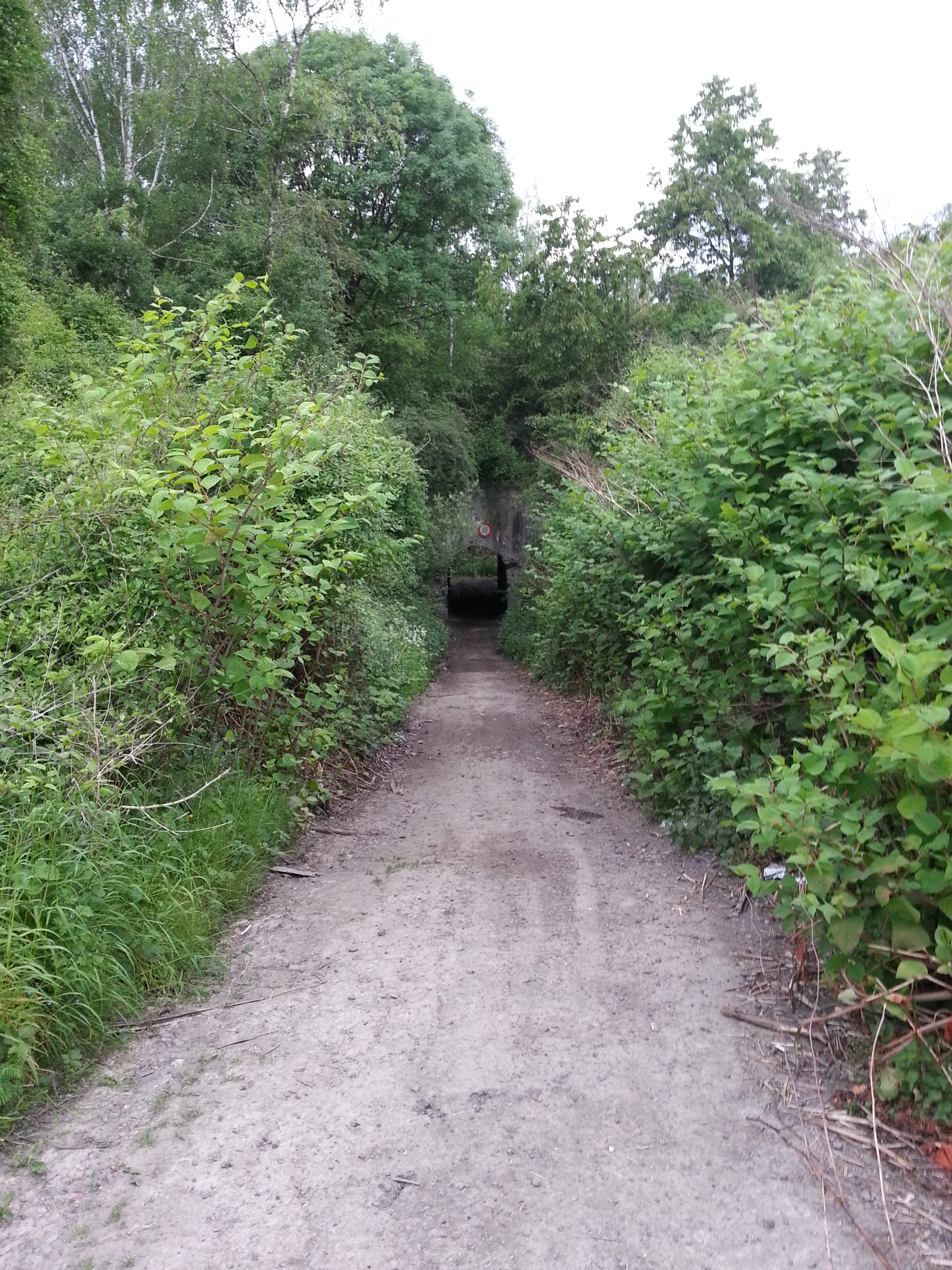

Site information
- Type: Fort
- Owner: Private
- Controlled by: Belgium
- Open to the public: No
- Condition: Abandoned

Location
- Location within Belgium
- Coordinates: 50.48622°N 4.80108°E

Site history
- Built: 1888
- Materials: Unreinforced concrete
- Battles/wars: Battle of Namur, Battle of Belgium

The Fort de Suarlée (French pronunciation: [fɔʁ də sɥaʁle]) is one of nine forts built as part of the Fortifications of Namur in the late 19th century in Belgium. It was built between 1888 and 1892 according to the plans of General Henri Alexis Brialmont. Contrasting with the French forts built in the same era by Raymond Adolphe Séré de Rivières, the fort was built exclusively of unreinforced concrete, a new material, rather than masonry. In 1914 the fort was heavily bombarded by German artillery in the Battle of Namur. Suarlée was upgraded in the 1930s to become part of the fortified position of Namur in an attempt to forestall or slow an attack from Germany. It saw action in 1940 during the Battle of Belgium, and was captured by German forces. The fort is now abandoned on private property.

== Description ==
The Fort de Suarlée is located about 5 kilometres (3.1 mi)northwest of the center of Namur. The fort, one of the larger Brialmont forts, is a triangle, similar to the Fort de Boncelles. It commands the Brussels-Namur train line. A 6-metre (20 ft) deep by 8-metre (26 ft) ditch encircles the fort. The ditches were defended in enfilade by 57 mm guns in casemates resembling counterscarp batteries, firing at shot traps at the other end of the ditch. The principal armament was concentrated in the central massif, closely grouped in a solid mass of concrete.

Belgian forts made little provision for the daily needs of their wartime garrisons, locating latrines, showers, kitchens and the morgue in the fort's counterscarp, a location that would be untenable in combat. This would have profound effects on the forts' ability to endure a long assault. The service areas were placed directly opposite the barracks, which opened into the ditch in the rear of the fort (i.e., in the face towards Namur), with lesser protection than the front and "salient" sides. The Brialmont forts placed a weaker side to the rear to allow for recapture by Belgian forces from the rear, and located the barracks and support facilities on this side, using the rear ditch for light and ventilation of living spaces. In combat heavy shellfire made the rear ditch untenable, and German forces were able to get between the forts and attack them from the rear. The Brialmont forts were designed to be protected from shellfire equaling their heaviest guns: 21 cm. The top of the central massif used 4 metres (13 ft) of unreinforced concrete, while the caserne walls, judged to be less exposed, used 1.5 metres (4.9 ft). Under fire, the forts were damaged by 21 cm fire and could not withstand heavier artillery. This structural limitation was compounded by the construction methodology. Under the stress of heavy siege artillery, the unreinforced concrete was prone to severe spalling, which contributed to the rapid collapse of the Brialmont forts during the 1914 siege.

== Armament ==
Suarlée's guns included one twin 15 cm turret, two single 21 cm turrets and two twin 12 cm turrets, all for distant targets. Four 57mm turrets with another nine 57mm guns in embrasures providing defense of the fort's ditches and postern. The fort also mounted an observation turret with a searchlight.

The fort's heavy guns were German, typically Krupp, while the turret mechanisms were from a variety of sources. The fort was provided with signal lights to permit communication with neighboring forts. The guns were fired using black powder rather than smokeless powder, producing choking gas in the confined firing spaces that spread throughout the fort.

== World War I ==
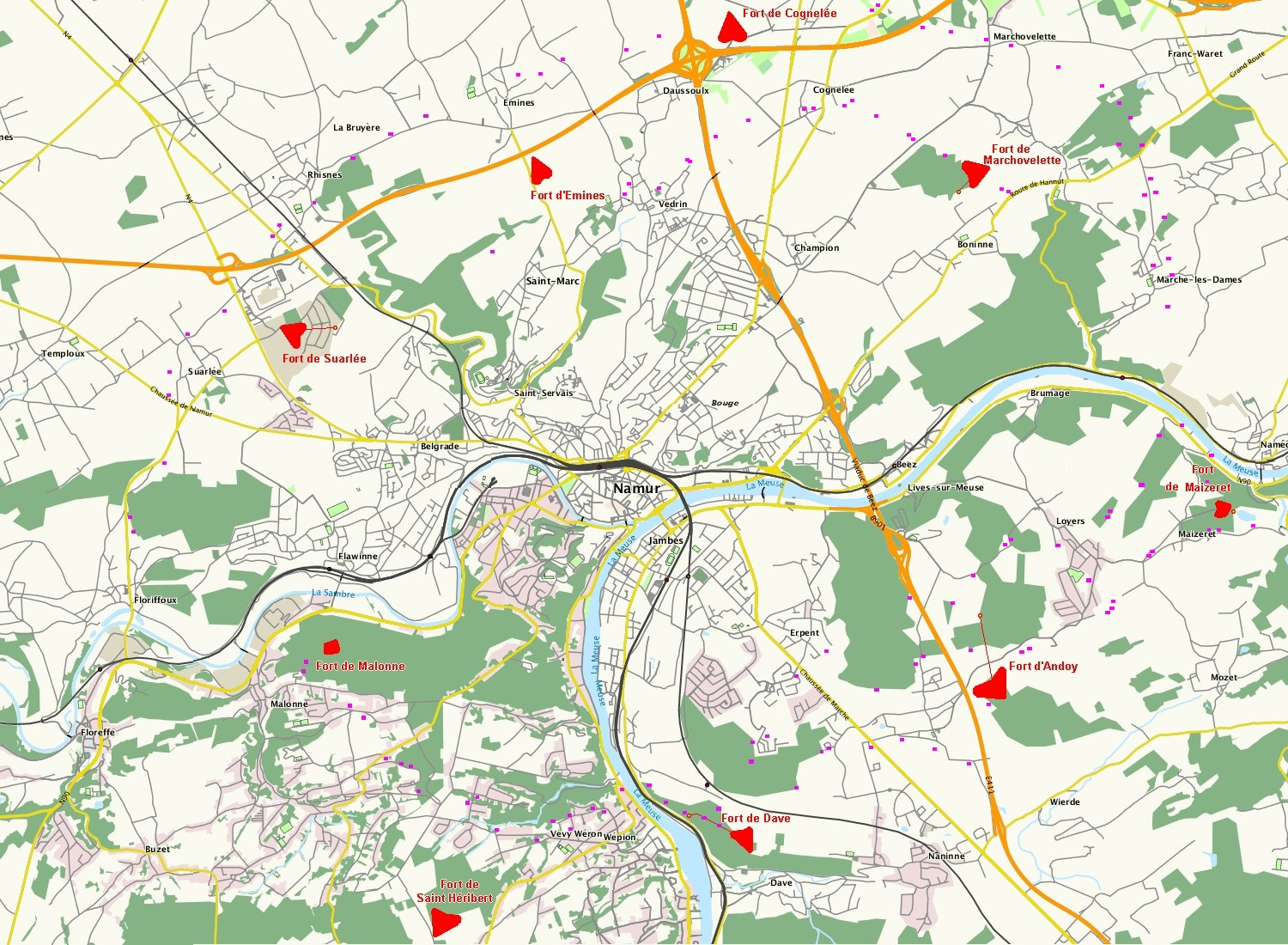
The forts of Namur

In the summer of 1914 the Fort de Suarlée was under the command of Captain-Commandant Moisse, with about 400 artillerymen and 80 fortress troops. The fort was bombarded by invading German forces beginning on 23 August 1914. The Germans did not bother with infantry assault at the Namur forts as had been tried at Liège, at a heavy cost, preferring to batter the Namur positions with artillery. The Namur forts fell quickly. On the 24th the fort was hit by about 1500 heavy projectiles, causing significant damage. On the 25th Suarlée was hit from the rear by another 1500 210mm, 305mm and 420mm shells, nearly destroying the fort and resulting in its surrender that day. A primary factor in this rapid capitulation was the deployment of German 42 cm Gamma Mörser siege howitzers. These weapons were capable of penetrating the unreinforced concrete roofs, rendering the forts' 21 cm protective standard insufficient.

== Fortified Position of Namur ==
Suarlée's armament was upgraded in the 1930s to become part of the Fortified Position of Namur, which was planned to deter a German incursion over the nearby border. Protection was substantially increased and armament was modernized. This was accompanied by improvements to ventilation, protection, sanitary facilities, communications and electrical power. The area surrounding the fort was equipped with improved shelters for the interval troops. This modernization reflected a shift in Belgian military doctrine, which envisioned the forts as anchors for interval troops—mobile infantry and artillery units deployed in the gaps between fortifications. The upgraded systems at Suarlée were specifically designed to coordinate fire with these forces, integrating the site into a broader defensive network.

After its renovation, Suarlée was armed with one twin 75mm turret, four retractable 75mm single turrets, two twin machine gun turrets and a number of observation cloches. Machine guns provided close protection. Ventilation was provided by an air inlet tower 900 metres (3,000 ft) outside the perimeter of the fort that doubled as an observation post. Six anti-aircraft guns were installed as well. It served as the instruction battery for the Namur area forts.

== Second World War ==
The Fort de Suarlée in May 1940 was commanded by Captain-Commandant Tislair with about 250 men. The fort was attacked from the air on the 10th, 11th and 12th. Aerial attack resumed on the 15th, together with firing from German anti-tank guns. On the 16th Suarlée supported the Fort de Marchovelette with artillery fire. Suarlée's ventilation tower was attacked by infantry on the 16th and 17th. The main fort was attacked by infantry on the night of the 17th. On the 18th there was another aerial attack, knocking out four 75mm guns and the machine gun turret. More bombardment followed on the 19th, and the fort surrendered.

== Present ==
The Fort de Suarlée is on private property, formerly leased from the state for hunting, and is not open to the public, although it is unsecured. It has been stripped of all salvageable materials. The air gallery is flooded. It was never repaired or rehabilitated after World War II.

== Bibliography ==
- Donnell, Clayton, The Forts of the Meuse in World War I, Osprey Publishing, Oxford, 2007, ISBN 978-1-84603-114-4.
- Kauffmann, J.E., Jurga, R., Fortress Europe: European Fortifications of World War II, Da Capo Press, USA, 2002, ISBN 0-306-81174-X.
