= Fort de Dave =

Fortification in Belgium

- Part of Fortifications of Namur
- Dave, Belgium
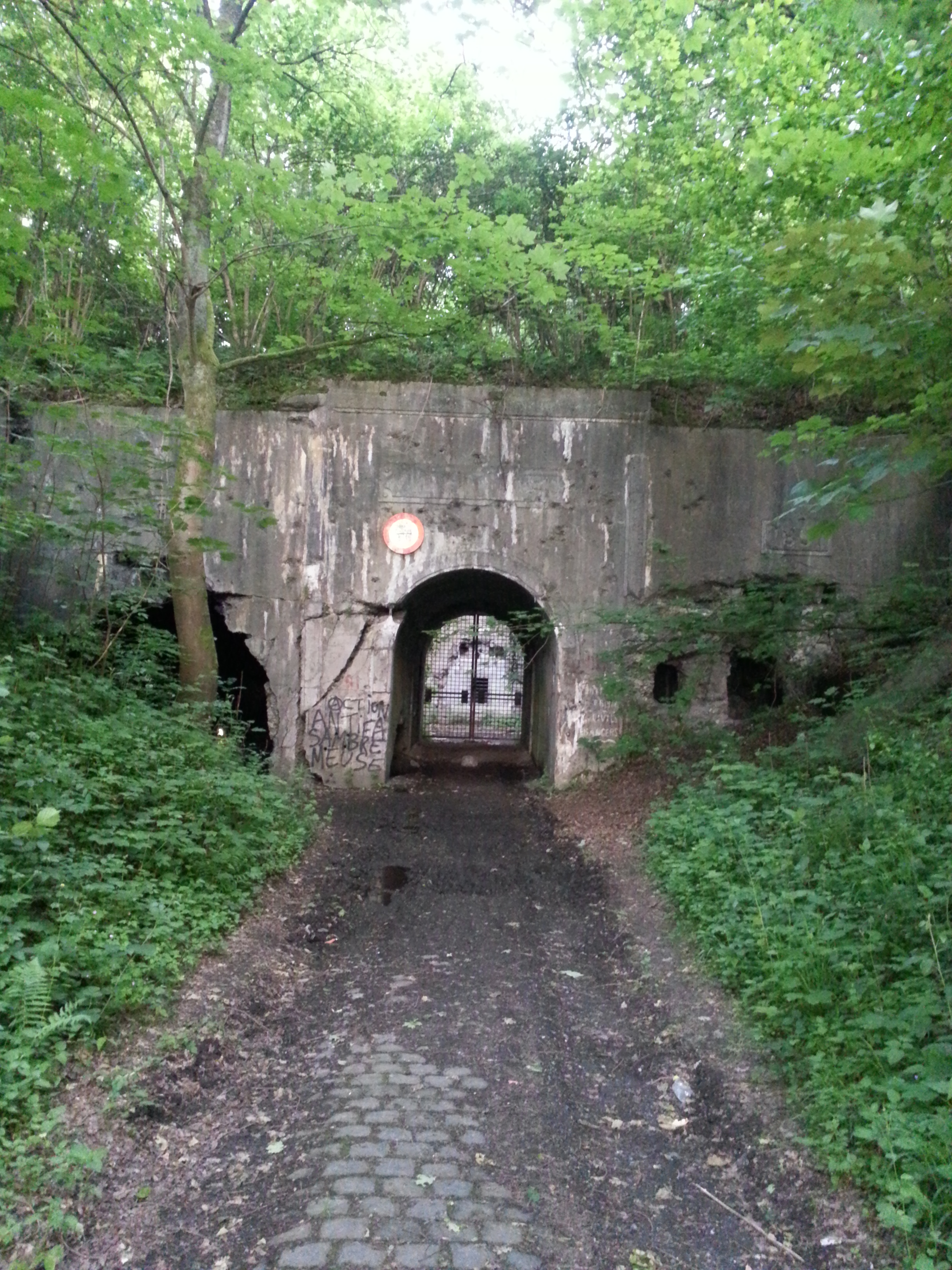

Site information
- Type: Fort
- Owner: Military
- Controlled by: Belgium
- Open to the public: No
- Condition: Abandoned

Location
- Coordinates: 50.42165°N 4.88991°E

Site history
- Built: 1888
- Materials: Unreinforced concrete
- Battles/wars: Battle of Namur, Battle of Belgium

The Fort de Dave is one of nine forts built as part of the Fortifications of Namur in the late 19th century in Belgium. It was built between 1888 and 1892 according to the plans of General Henri Alexis Brialmont. Contrasting with the French forts built in the same era by Raymond Adolphe Séré de Rivières, the fort was built exclusively of unreinforced concrete, a new material, rather than masonry. In 1914 the fort was heavily bombarded by German artillery in the Battle of Namur. Dave was upgraded in the 1930s to become part of the fortified position of Namur in an attempt to forestall or slow an attack from Germany. It saw action in 1940 during the Battle of Belgium, and was captured by German forces. The fort is now abandoned on state property.

== Description ==
The Fort de Dave is located about 5 kilometres (3.1 mi) south of the center of Namur. The fort, one of the smaller Brialmont forts, is a triangle overlooking the Meuse. A 6-metre (20 ft) deep by 8-metre (26 ft) ditch encircles the fort. The ditches were defended in enfilade by 57 mm guns in casemates resembling counterscarp batteries, firing at shot traps at the other end of the ditch. The principal armament was concentrated in the central massif, closely grouped in a solid mass of concrete.

Belgian forts made little provision for the daily needs of their wartime garrisons, locating latrines, showers, kitchens and the morgue in the fort's counterscarp, a location that would be untenable in combat. This would have profound effects on the forts' ability to endure a long assault. The service areas were placed directly opposite the barracks, which opened into the ditch in the rear of the fort (i.e., in the face towards Namur), with lesser protection than the front and "salient" sides. The Brialmont forts placed a weaker side to the rear to allow for recapture by Belgian forces from the rear, and located the barracks and support facilities on this side, using the rear ditch for light and ventilation of living spaces. In combat heavy shellfire made the rear ditch untenable, and German forces were able to get between the forts and attack them from the rear. The Brialmont forts were designed to be protected from shellfire equaling their heaviest guns: 21cm. The top of the central massif used 4 metres (13 ft) of unreinforced concrete, while the caserne walls, judged to be less exposed, used 1.5 metres (4.9 ft). Under fire, the forts were damaged by 21cm fire and could not withstand heavier artillery.

The three forts on the right bank of the Meuse were linked by a military railway.

== Armament ==
Dave's guns included one twin 15cm turret, one single 21cm turret and two twin 12cm turrets, all for distant targets. Three 57mm turrets with another six 57mm guns in embrasures providing defense of the fort's ditches and postern. The fort also mounted an observation turret with a searchlight.

The fort's heavy guns were German, typically Krupp, while the turret mechanisms were from a variety of sources. The fort was provided with signal lights to permit communication with neighboring forts. The guns were fired using black powder rather than smokeless powder, producing choking gas in the confined firing spaces that spread throughout the fort.

== World War I ==
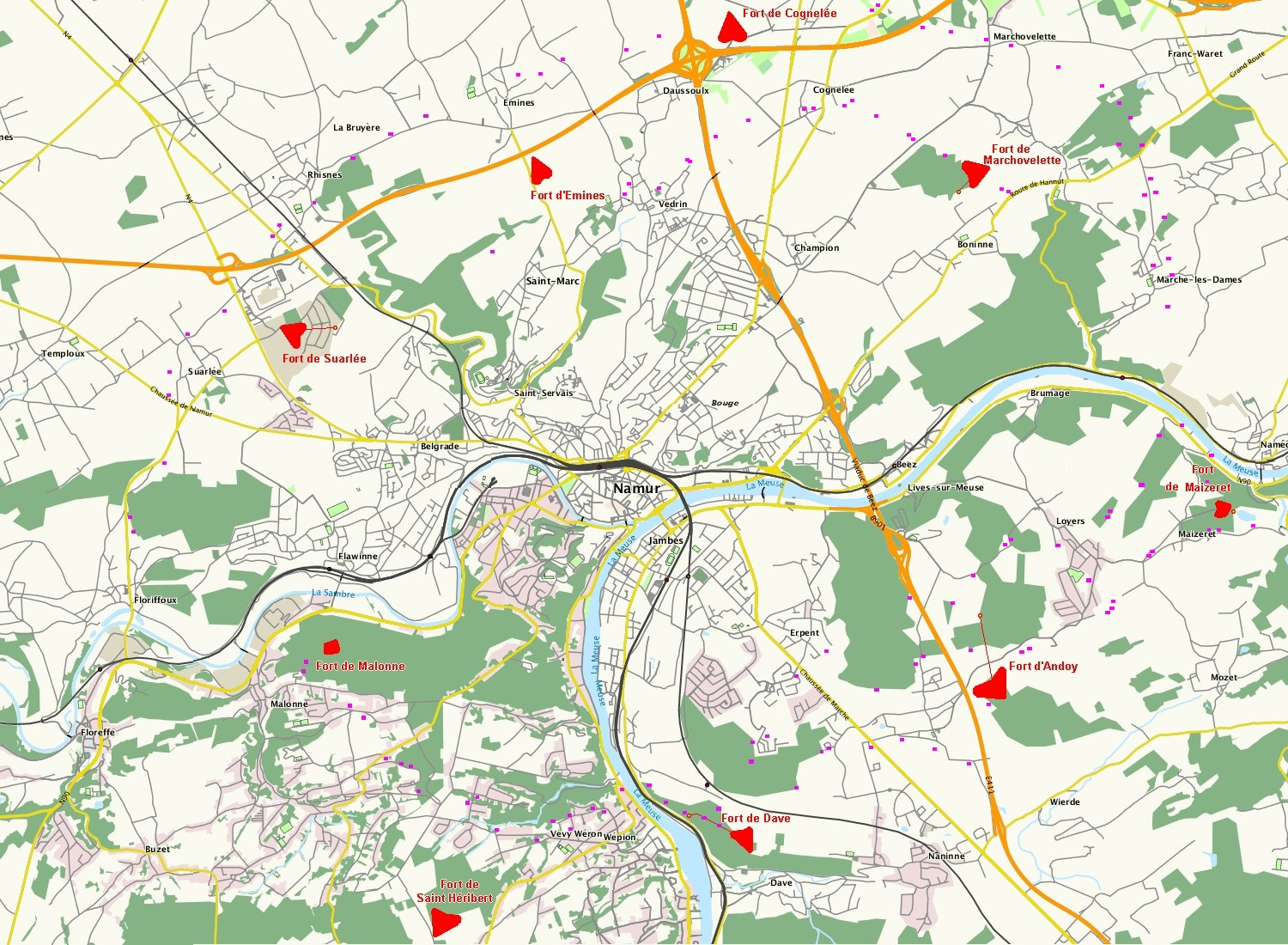
The forts of Namur

In 1914 the Fort de Dave was commanded by Captain-Commandant Manteau, with 269 artillerymen and 82 fortress troops. Dave was first attacked on 20 August, and resisted until the 25th, when it surrendered honorably.

== Fortified Position of Namur ==
Dave's armament was upgraded in the 1930s to become part of the Fortified Position of Namur, which was planned to deter a German incursion over the nearby border. Protection was substantially increased and armament was modernized. This was accompanied by improvements to ventilation, protection, sanitary facilities, communications and electrical power. The area surrounding the fort was equipped with improved shelters for the interval troops, with two large shelters, called Relève and Troonois, nearby. The new air intake was camouflaged into the rocky bluff overlooking the Meuse, 860 metres (2,820 ft) to the northwest. It also provided protected access to the Relève and Troonois blockhouses.

Weapons in 1940 included one twin 75mm turret, three single retracting 75mm turrets, two observation cloches and a twin machine gun cloche. T=The entrance was defended by two machine gun positions and a grenade launcher. The Abri de la Relève was defended by two machine guns and an observation cloche, and the Abri du Troonois had two machine guns and a 60mm anti-tank gun.

== Second World War ==
The Fort de Dave was commanded in 1940 by Captain-Commandant Noel. It was first attacked by invading German forces on 15 May 1940 and surrendered honorably on 24 May, with one dead.

== Present ==
The Fort de Dave is not open to the public and remains state property. Most of the metal was salvaged from the site and was used for testing explosives. It was never repaired or rehabilitated after World War II.

== Bibliography ==
- Donnell, Clayton, The Forts of the Meuse in World War I, Osprey Publishing, Oxford, 2007, ISBN 978-1-84603-114-4.
- Kauffmann, J.E., Jurga, R., Fortress Europe: European Fortifications of World War II, Da Capo Press, USA, 2002, ISBN 0-306-81174-X.
