= Fort de Malonne =

- Part of Fortifications of Namur
- Malonne, Belgium
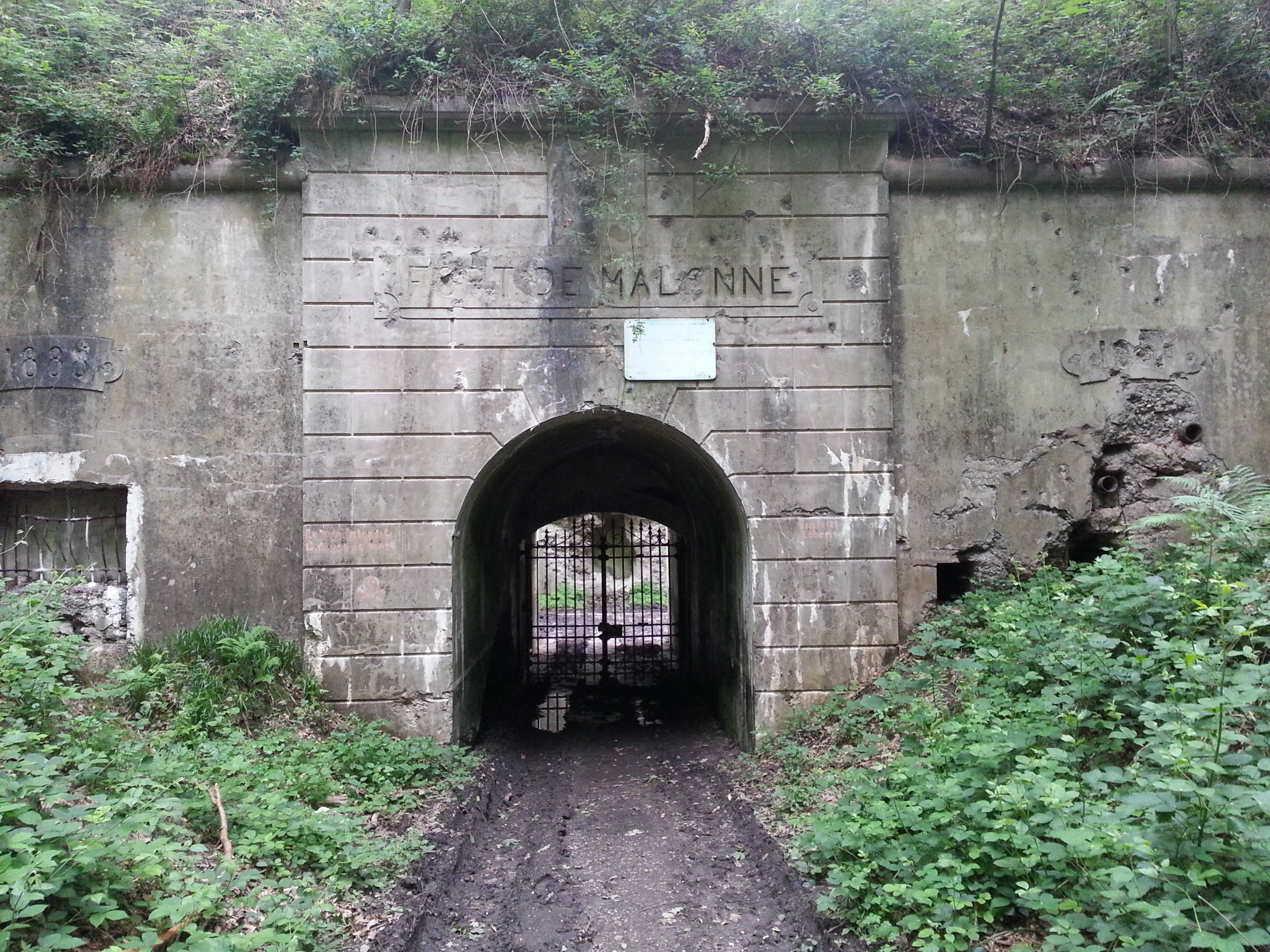

Site information
- Type: Fort
- Controlled by: Belgium
- Open to the public: No
- Condition: Abandoned, nature preserve

Location
- Coordinates: 50.44411°N 4.80816°E

Site history
- Built: 1888
- Materials: Unreinforced concrete
- Battles/wars: Battle of Namur, Battle of Belgium

The Fort de Malonne is one of nine forts built as part of the Fortifications of Namur in the late 19th century in Belgium. It was built between 1888 and 1892 according to the plans of General Henri Alexis Brialmont. Contrasting with the French forts built in the same era by Raymond Adolphe Séré de Rivières, the fort was built exclusively of unreinforced concrete, a new material, rather than masonry. In 1914 the fort was heavily bombarded by German artillery in the Battle of Namur. Malonne was upgraded in the 1930s to become part of the fortified position of Namur in an attempt to forestall or slow an attack from Germany. It saw action in 1940 during the Battle of Belgium, and was captured by German forces. The fort is now part of a nature preserve and is a habitat for bats.

== Description ==
The Fort de Malonne is located about 4.5 kilometres (2.8 mi) southwest of the center of Namur. The fort forms an irregular rectangle in plan. A 6-metre (20 ft) deep by 8-metre (26 ft) ditch encircles the fort. The ditches were defended in enfilade by 57 mm guns in casemates resembling counterscarp batteries, firing at shot traps at the other end of the ditch. The principal armament was concentrated in the central massif, closely grouped in a solid mass of concrete.

Belgian forts made little provision for the daily needs of their wartime garrisons, locating latrines, showers, kitchens and the morgue in the fort's counterscarp, a location that would be untenable in combat. This would have profound effects on the forts' ability to endure a long assault. The service areas were placed directly opposite the barracks, which opened into the ditch in the rear of the fort (i.e., in the face towards Namur), with lesser protection than the front and "salient" sides. The Brialmont forts placed a weaker side to the rear to allow for recapture by Belgian forces from the rear, and located the barracks and support facilities on this side, using the rear ditch for light and ventilation of living spaces. In combat heavy shellfire made the rear ditch untenable, and German forces were able to get between the forts and attack them from the rear. The Brialmont forts were designed to be protected from shellfire equaling their heaviest guns: 21cm. The top of the central massif used 4 metres (13 ft) of unreinforced concrete, while the caserne walls, judged to be less exposed, used 1.5 metres (4.9 ft). Under fire, the forts were damaged by 21cm fire and could not withstand heavier artillery.

== Armament ==
Malonne's armament included a rotating turret with a single 21 cm gun, a 15cm turret with twin guns and two 12 cm turrets with single guns, all for distant targets. Three retractable 57 mm gun turrets were provided for local defense. The fort also mounted an observation turret with a searchlight. Six rapid-fire 57 mm guns were provided in casemates for the defense of the ditches and the postern, as well as two mobile guns.

The fort's heavy guns were German, typically Krupp, while the turret mechanisms were from a variety of sources. The fort was provided with signal lights to permit communication with neighboring forts. The guns were fired using black powder rather than smokeless powder, producing choking gas in the confined firing spaces that spread throughout the fort.

== First World War ==
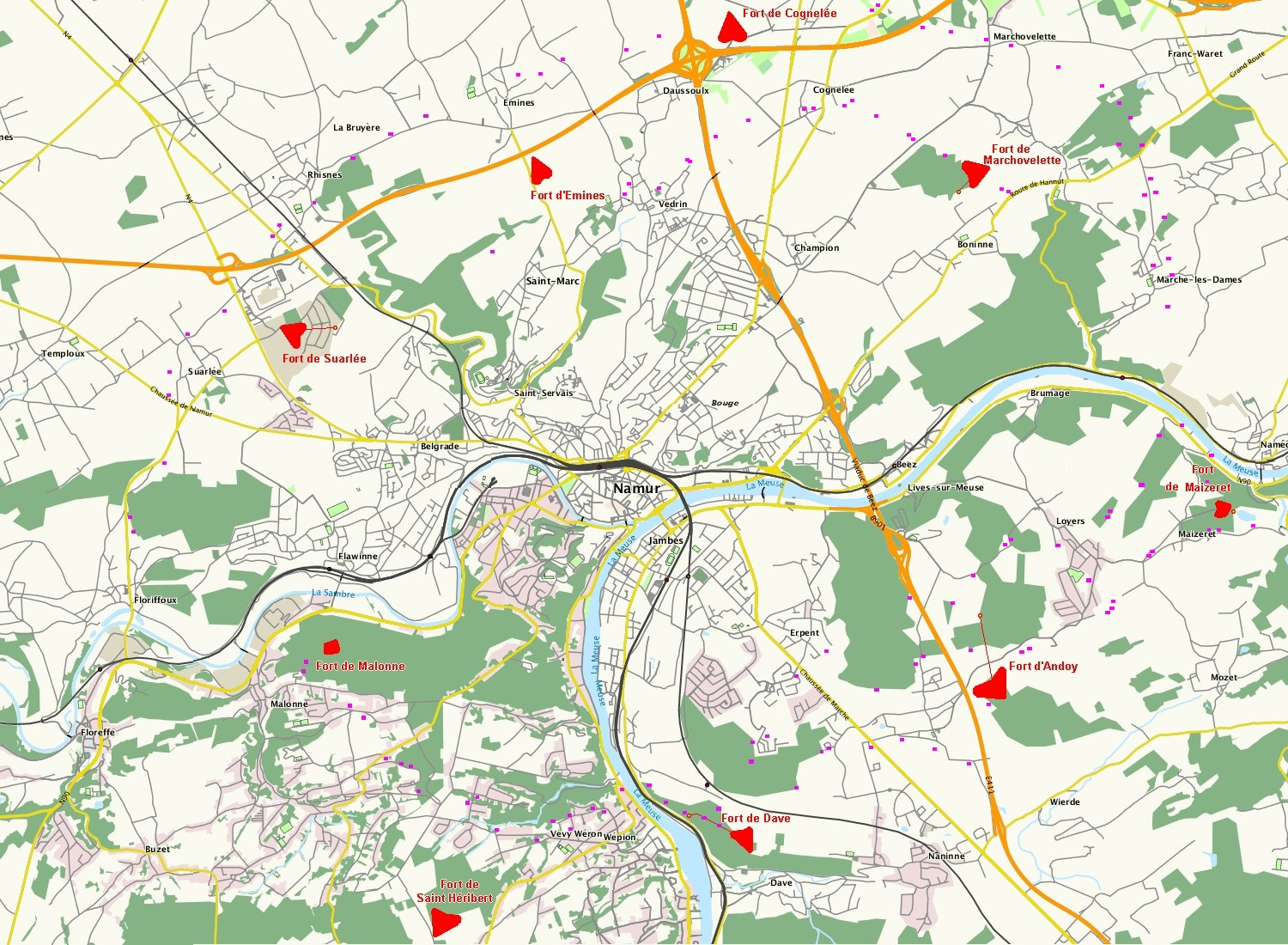
The forts of Namur

== Fortified Position of Namur ==
Malonne's armament was upgraded in the 1930s to become part of the Fortified Position of Namur, which was planned to deter a German incursion over the nearby border. The 21 cm turret was replaced with longer-range 15m turrets, the 15 cm turret was replaced by a turret with machine guns and grenade launchers, and the 12 cm turrets were replaced with turrets containing twin 105 mm guns. Protection was substantially increased. This was accompanied by improvements to ventilation, protection, sanitary facilities, communications and electrical power.

== Second World War ==
In 1940 during the Battle of France Malonne was commanded by Captain-Commandant Demaret. The fort surrendered to the Germans on 21 May 1940, after exhausting its ability to fight back. Before surrendering the garrison sabotaged what arms were left intact. The garrison's surrender was accepted by the Germans with military honors.

== Present ==
The fort's site is a nature preserve. Since 1991 the fort has been closed to public access and is a protected habitat for bats. The site is administered by the Amicale pour la sauvegarde du Fort Malonne.

== Bibliography ==
- Donnell, Clayton, The Forts of the Meuse in World War I, Osprey Publishing, Oxford, 2007, ISBN 978-1-84603-114-4.
- Kauffmann, J.E., Jurga, R., Fortress Europe: European Fortifications of World War II, Da Capo Press, USA, 2002, ISBN 0-306-81174-X.
