= Sectional density =

Gun ballistic calculation

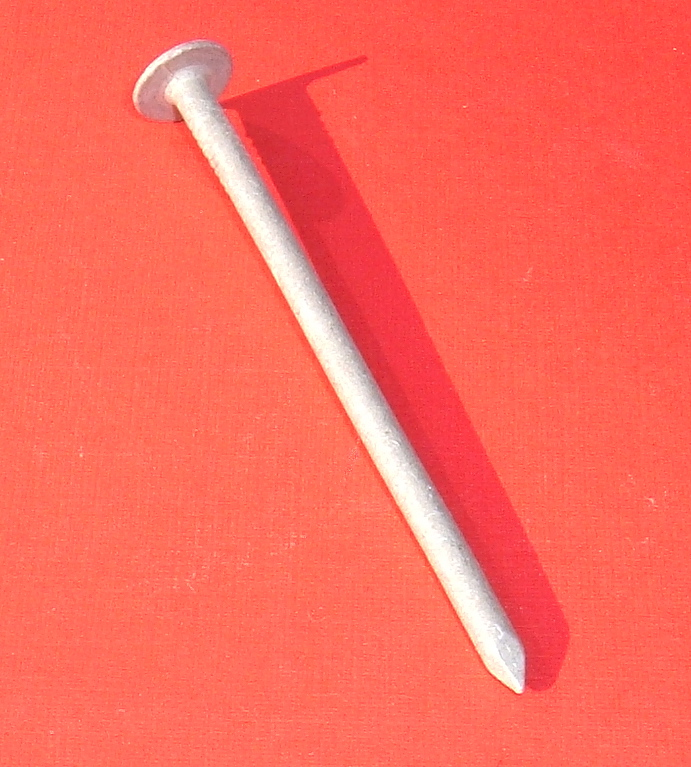
- A metal nail has a small cross sectional area compared to its mass, resulting in a high sectional density.
- SI unit: kilograms per square meter (kg/m^{2})
- Other units: kilograms per square centimeter (kg/cm^{2}) grams per square millimeter (g/mm^{2}) pounds per square inch (lb_{m}/in^{2})

Sectional density (often abbreviated SD) is the ratio of an object's mass to its cross sectional area with respect to a given axis. It conveys how well an object's mass is distributed (by its shape) to overcome resistance along that axis.

Sectional density is used in gun ballistics. In this context, it is the ratio of a projectile's mass (often in either kilograms, grams, pounds or grains) to its transverse section (often in either square centimeters, square millimeters or square inches), with respect to the axis of motion. It conveys how well an object's mass is distributed (by its shape) to overcome resistance along that axis. For illustration, a nail can penetrate a target medium with its pointed end first with less force than a coin of the same mass lying flat on the target medium.

During World War II, bunker-busting Röchling shells were developed by German engineer August Coenders, based on the theory of increasing sectional density to improve penetration. Röchling shells were tested in 1942 and 1943 against the Belgian Fort d'Aubin-Neufchâteau and saw very limited use during World War II.

== Formula ==
In a general physics context, sectional density is defined as:

$SD = \frac{M}{A}$

- SD is the sectional density
- M is the mass of the projectile
- A is the cross-sectional area

The SI derived unit for sectional density is kilograms per square meter (kg/m^{2}). The general formula with units then becomes:

$$SD_{\text{kg}/\text{m}^2} = \frac{ m_\text{kg} }{ {A_{\text{m}^2}} }$$

where:

- SD_{kg/m^{2}} is the sectional density in kilograms per square meters
- m_{kg} is the weight of the object in kilograms
- A_{m^{2}} is the cross sectional area of the object in meters

== Units conversion table ==
Conversions between units for sectional density
	kg/m^{2}	kg/cm^{2}	g/mm^{2}	lb_{m}/in^{2}
1 kg/m^{2} =	**1**	**0.0001**	**0.001**	0.001422334
1 kg/cm^{2} =	**10000**	**1**	**10**	14.223343307
1 g/mm^{2} =	**1000**	**0.1**	**1**	1.4223343307
1 lb_{m}/in^{2} =	703.069579639	0.070306957	0.703069579	**1**

(Values in bold face are exact.)

- 1 g/mm^{2} equals exactly 1000 kg/m^{2}.
- 1 kg/cm^{2} equals exactly 10000 kg/m^{2}.
- With the pound and inch legally defined as 0.45359237 kg and 0.0254 m respectively, it follows that the (mass) pounds per square inch is approximately:
  1 lb_{m}/in^{2} = 0.45359237 kg/(0.0254 m × 0.0254 m) ≈ 703.06958 kg/m^{2}

== Use in ballistics ==
The sectional density of a projectile can be employed in two areas of ballistics. Within external ballistics, when the sectional density of a projectile is divided by its coefficient of form (form factor in commercial small arms jargon); it yields the projectile's ballistic coefficient. Sectional density has the same (implied) units as the ballistic coefficient.

Within terminal ballistics, the sectional density of a projectile is one of the determining factors for projectile penetration. The interaction between projectile (fragments) and target media is however a complex subject. A study regarding hunting bullets shows that besides sectional density several other parameters determine bullet penetration.

If all other factors are equal, the projectile with the greatest amount of sectional density will penetrate the deepest.

=== Metric units ===
When working with ballistics using SI units, it is common to use either grams per square millimeter or kilograms per square centimeter. Their relationship to the base unit kilograms per square meter is shown in the conversion table above.

==== Grams per square millimeter ====
Using grams per square millimeter (g/mm^{2}), the formula then becomes:

$$SD_{\text{g}/\text{mm}^2} = \frac{ 4 m_\text{g} }{ { \pi \cdot d _\text{mm}}^2 }$$

Where:

- SD_{g/mm^{2}} is the sectional density in grams per square millimeters
- m_{g} is the mass of the projectile in grams
- d_{mm} is the diameter of the projectile in millimeters

For example, a small arms bullet with a mass of 10.4 grams (160 gr) and having a diameter of 6.70 mm (0.264 in) has a sectional density of:

4 · 10.4 / (π·6.7^{2}) = 0.295 g/mm^{2}

==== Kilograms per square centimeter ====
Using kilograms per square centimeter (kg/cm^{2}), the formula then becomes:

$$SD_{\text{kg}/\text{cm}^2} = \frac{ 4 m_\text{kg} }{ {\pi d_{\text{cm}}}^2 }$$

Where:

- SD_{kg/cm^{2}} is the sectional density in kilograms per square centimeter
- m_{g} is the mass of the projectile in grams
- d_{cm} is the diameter of the projectile in centimeters

For example, an M107 projectile with a mass of 43.2 kg and having a body diameter of 154.71 millimetres (15.471 cm) has a sectional density of:

4 · 43.2 / (π·154.71^{2}) = 0.230 kg/cm^{2}

=== English units ===
In older ballistics literature from English speaking countries, and still to this day, the most commonly used unit for sectional density of circular cross-sections is (mass) pounds per square inch (lb_{m}/in^{2}) The formula then becomes:

$SD_{\text{lb}/\text{in}^2} = \frac{ 4 m_\text{lb} }{ {\pi \cdot d_\text{in}}^2} = \frac{ 4 m_\text{gr} }{\pi \cdot 7000 \, {d_\text{in}}^2 }$

$$SD_\mathrm{lbs/sq in} = \frac{ 4 \cdot m_\mathrm{lb} }{ {\pi \cdot d_\mathrm{in}}^2} = \frac{ 4 \cdot m_\mathrm{gr} }{ \pi \cdot 7000 \, {d_\mathrm{in}}^2 }$$

where:

- SD is the sectional density in (mass) pounds per square inch
- the mass of the projectile is:
  - m_{lb} in pounds
  - m_{gr} in grains
- d_{in} is the diameter of the projectile in inches

The sectional density defined this way is usually presented without units. In Europe the derivative unit g/cm^{2} is also used in literature regarding small arms projectiles to get a number in front of the decimal separator.

As an example, a bullet with a mass of 160 grains (10.4 g) and a diameter of 0.264 in (6.7 mm), has a sectional density (SD) of:

4·(160 gr/7000) / (π·0.264 in^{2}) = 0.418 lb_{m}/in^{2}

As another example, the M107 projectile mentioned above with a mass of 95.2 pounds (43.2 kg) and having a body diameter of 6.0909 inches (154.71 mm) has a sectional density of:

4 · (95.24) / (π·6.0909^{2}) = 3.268 lb_{m}/in^{2}

== See also ==
- Ballistic coefficient
