= Fort de Tancrémont =

Place in World War II in Belgium

- Part of Fortified Position of Liège
- Pepinster, Belgium
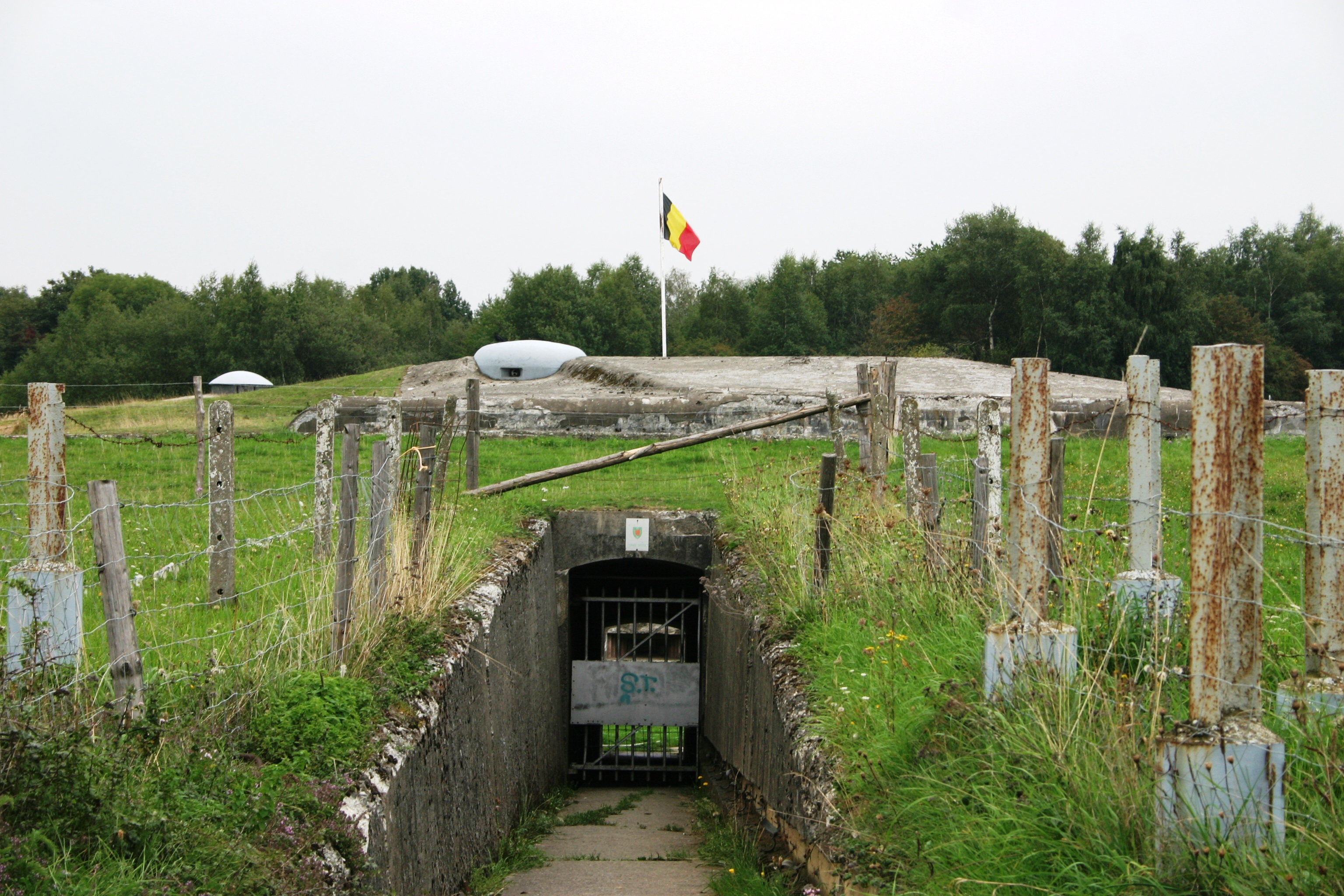

Site information
- Type: Fort
- Controlled by: Belgium
- Open to the public: Yes
- Condition: Preserved

Location
- Coordinates: 50.55295°N 5.79094°E

Site history
- Materials: Reinforced concrete, deep excavation
- Battles/wars: Battle of Belgium

The Fort de Tancrémont (French pronunciation: [fɔʁ də tɑ̃kʁemɔ̃]) is a Belgian fortification located about 3 kilometres (1.9 mi) south of Pepinster. The fort was built in the 1930s as part of the fortified position of Liège, augmenting the twelve original forts built to defend Liège in the 1880s with four more forts closer to the Belgian frontier with Germany. The fort was the last Belgian fort to surrender to German forces in the opening days of World War II, following the dramatic assault on Tancrémont's sister fort, Fort Eben-Emael. Tancrémont has been preserved and may be visited by the public.

== Situation ==
The fort is the southernmost of the four 1930s forts, located about 18 kilometres (11 mi) southeast of Liège. Tancrémont and Fort d'Aubin-Neufchâteau are smaller than Eben-Emael and Fort de Battice. Collectively, the line was known as the Fortified Position of Liège I (Position Fortifiée de Liège 1 (PFL I) ), the original Liège forts constituting PFL II.

== Description ==
Map of the Fortified Position of Liège

The Fort de Tancrémont was a development of the original Belgian fortifications designed by General Henri Alexis Brialmont before World War I, a relatively compact ensemble of gun turrets and observation posts disposed on a central massif of reinforced concrete, surrounded by a defended ditch. This was in contrast with French thinking for the contemporary Maginot Line fortifications, which were based on the dispersed fort palmé concept, with no clearly defined perimeter, a lesson learned from the experiences of French and Belgian forts in World War I. The new Belgian forts, while more conservative in design than the French ouvrages, included several new features as a result of World War I experience. The gun turrets were less closely grouped. Reinforced concrete was used in place of plain mass concrete, and its placement was done with greater care to avoid weak joints between pours. Ventilation was greatly improved, magazines were deeply buried and protected, and sanitary facilities and general living arrangements for the troops were given careful attention. Tancrémont was among the smaller of the new Belgian forts, armed with a maximum gun caliber of 75mm. These guns did not have sufficient range to provide mutual support between neighboring fortifications.

The Fort de Tancrémont comprised five combat blocks on a ridge between Pepinster and Theux. Only the tops of the blocks were visible, with the majority of the fort sunk into the ground.

- Block B.I, the peacetime entry block with light arms, searchlight and observation cupola or "cloche."
- Block B.II, equipped with retractable turrets mounting twin 75mm guns.
- Block B.III, three observation cloches with periscopes and machine guns.
- Block B.IV, similar to B.II.
- Block B.M., in the center, mounting three 81mm mortars and an observation block.

The fort also included counterscarp positions arranged to fire along the ditches with 47mm guns, machine guns and grenade launchers, designated C.II, C.III and C.IV. Two ventilation blocks designated B.O. and B.P. provided air. B.P. was located above the main living accommodations and was the combat entrance, armed with machine guns, while O was an emergency exit. Both B.O. and B.P. were outside the defended perimeter, above deeply buried galleries. The fort included a false cupola, designated "K."

The subterranean galleries totaled slightly less than 2,000 metres (6,600 ft) of passages buried between 20 metres (66 ft) and 28 metres (92 ft) below the surface, linking troop accommodations, a command post ammunition magazines and utility plants. Construction was directed by Lieutenant Victor Gérard. Unlike its three sisters, Tancrémont lacked a rolling drawbridge entrance, a result of its late completion.

The main 75mm guns were Bofors Model 1934, made at the Fonderie Royale des Canons (FRC). The 47mm guns were FRC Model 1936. Tancrémont was intended to receive 120mm guns like Eben-Emael and Battice, but block B.III received only machine guns.

== Personnel ==
In 1940 Tancrémont was commanded by Commandant-Captain Devos of the 4th Battalion of the Liègeois Fortress Regiment, commanded by Major Parmentier.

== History ==
The Fort de Tancrémont was completed on 8 August 1938, the last of the new forts in the Fortified Position of Liège. In 1940 the fort was commanded by Captain Abel Devos.

At the time of the German invasion of Belgium, some construction was taking place at the fort. The main fort was accessible by workers' excavations, compromising security and protection. On 12 May 1940 the Germans attacked, having already captured Eben-Emael the previous day. The German commander, General Fedor von Bock, demanded the surrender of Battice and Tancrémont on 20–21 May after the German capture of Aubin-Neufchâteau had resulted in significant casualties on both sides. Battice complied on 22 May, but Tancrémont refused. The Germans therefore bypassed Tancrémont. The fort held out through the capitulation of the Belgian field army, Captain Devos believing that the surrender applied only to field forces. Devos eventually obtained written confirmation of the general surrender order signed by General Spang and surrendered the fort the day after the general capitulation, on 29 May 1940. The garrison was sent by the Germans to labor in Silesia.

== Present day ==
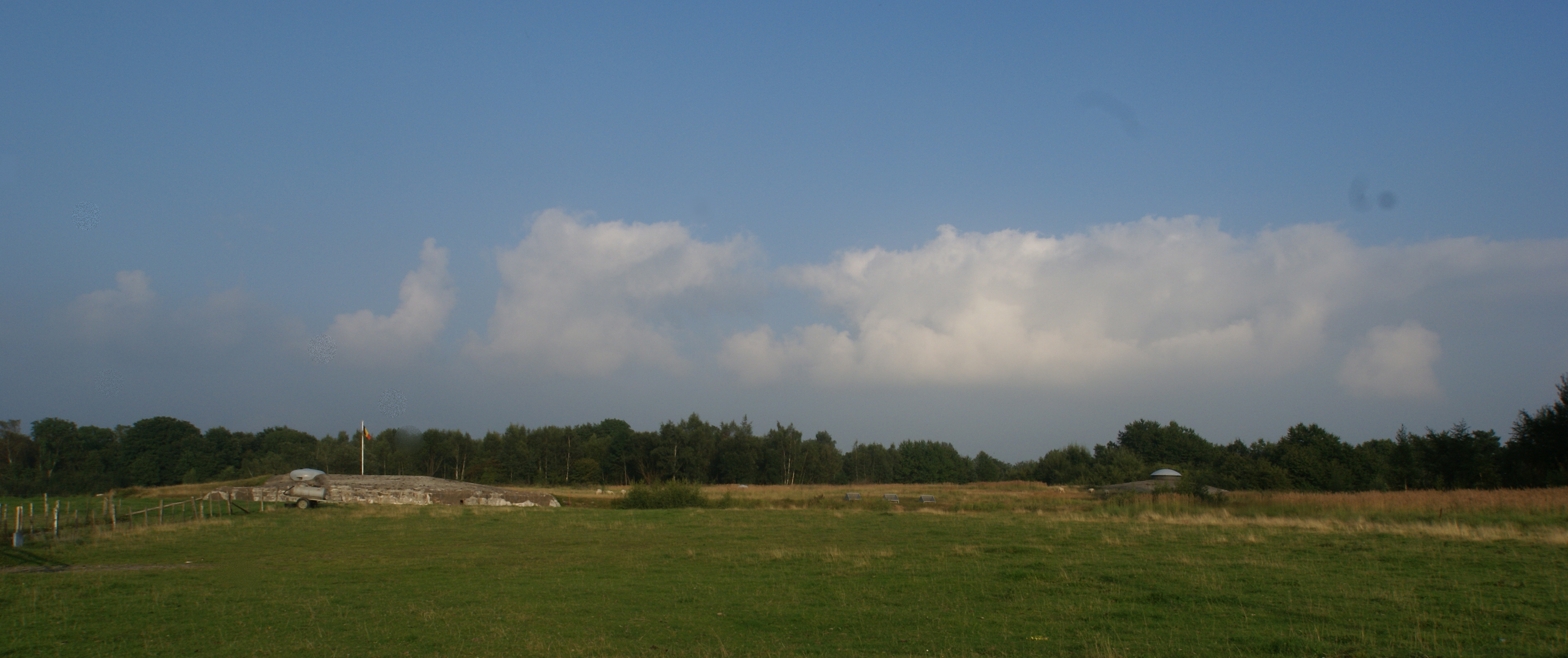
View of the fort's surface

The fort is preserved and open for public tours. The main body of the fort, in its defensive enclosure, is just to the south of the main road. Blocks B.O. and B.P. are across the road. The fort is administered by the Amicale du Fort de Tancrémont, descended from the Fraternelle du Fort de Pepinster organized by Captain Devos in September 1942 to reunite the troops of the garrison with their families.

The last surviving veteran of the fort's original garrison was Maurice Gast. He had been conscripted into the Belgian Army from his civilian employment as an electrician at the Houget-Duesberg-Bodson textile works and was retained at the fort after the surrender to maintain its electrical systems. Gast died on 21 August 2020, at the age of 100.

== See also ==
- Fort d'Aubin-Neufchâteau
- Fort de Battice
