= VSK =

VSK may refer to:

- VSK Bandy, Swedish bandy club
- VSK Osterholz-Scharmbeck, German football club
- Pécsi VSK (men's water polo)
- VSK-94, sniper rifle
- HIW VSK, carbine
- VSK Insurance, Russian insurance company (IJSC VSK)
