= Fort Ében-Émael =

Inactive Belgian fortress on the Belgian–Dutch border

Fort Eben-Emael
- Fort d'Ében-Émael
- Part of Fortified Position of Liège
- Eben-Emael, Belgium
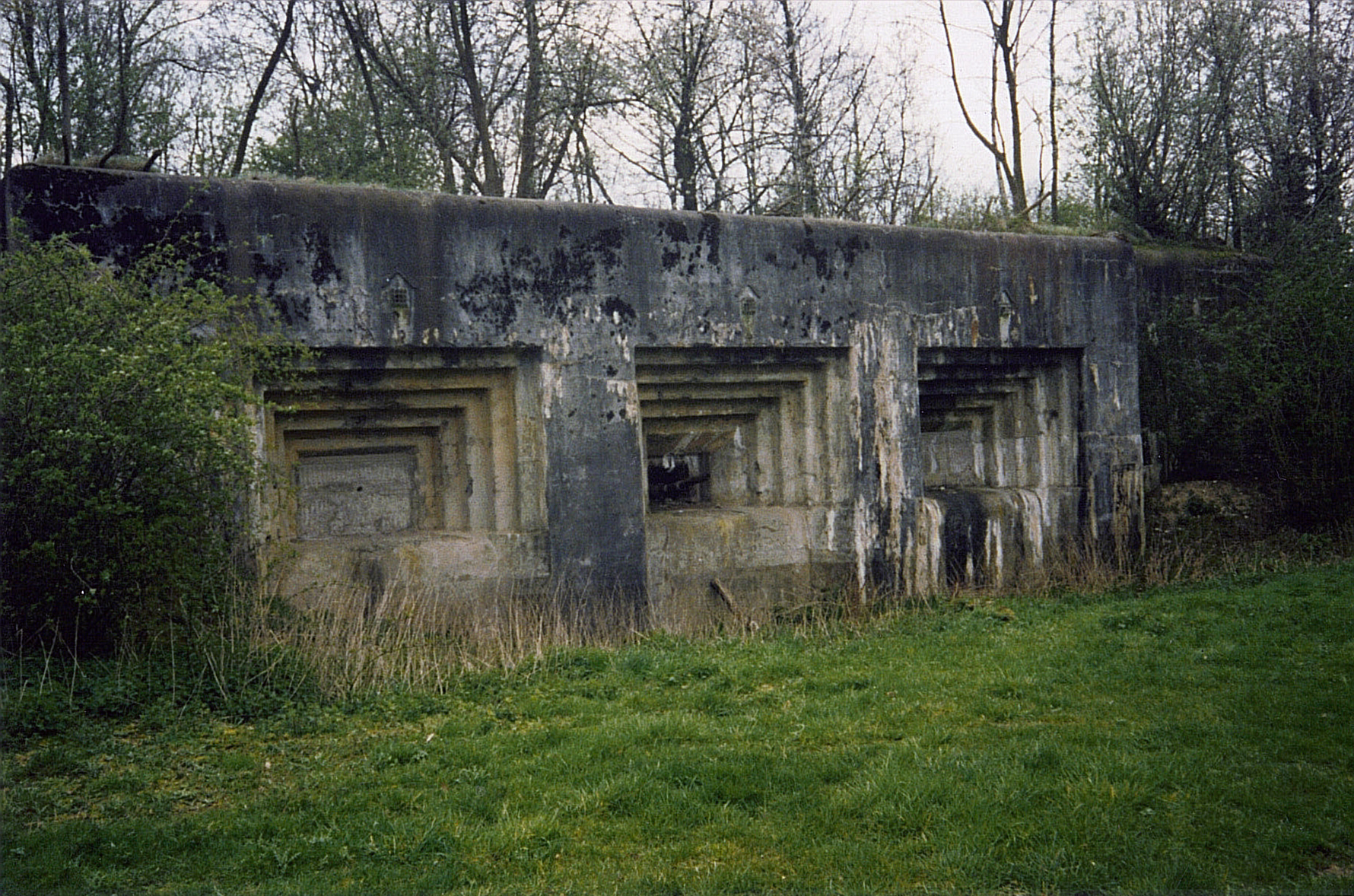
- "Maastricht 2" one of Fort Eben-Emael's casemates.

Site information
- Type: Fort
- Controlled by: Belgium
- Open to the public: Yes
- Condition: Preserved

Location
- Location within Belgium
- Coordinates: 50.79755°N 5.67899°E

Site history
- Built: 1932–35
- Built by: Belgian Army
- Materials: Reinforced concrete, deep excavation, rock excavation
- Battles/wars: Battle of Belgium

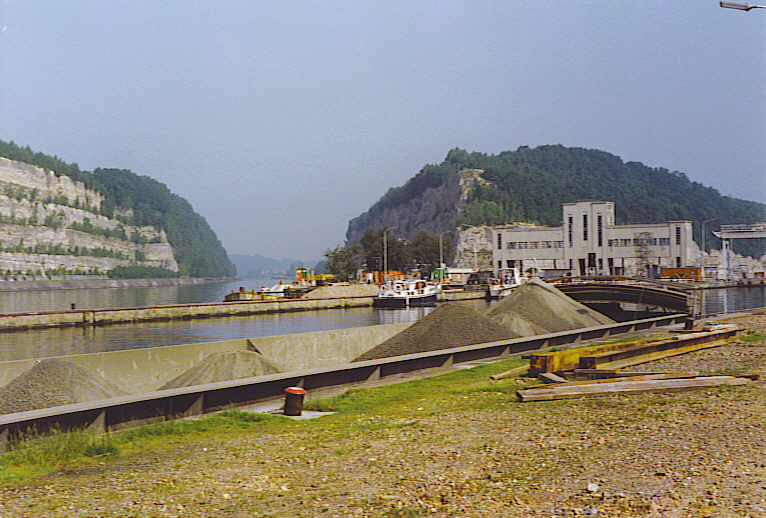
Section of the Caestert Plateau where the Albert Canal can be seen cutting through the ridge

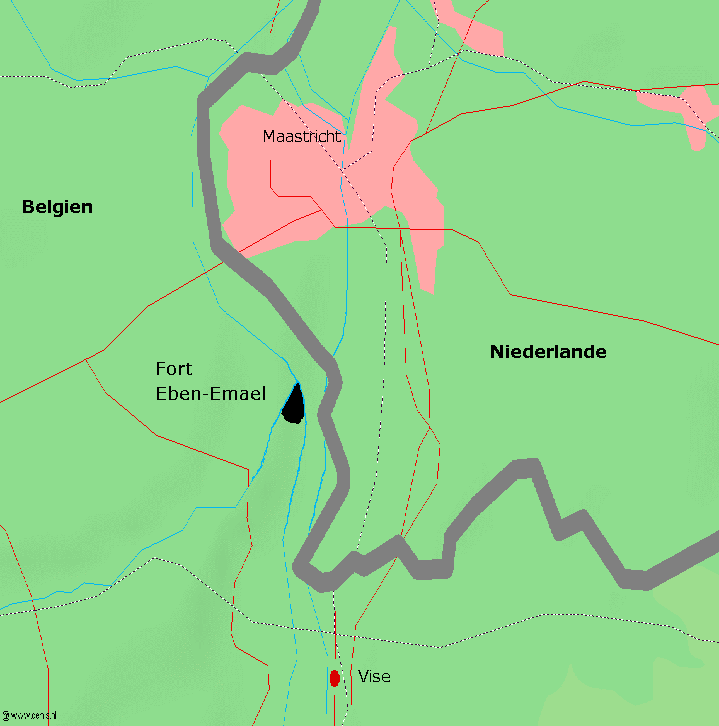
Map of the area between Belgium and the Netherlands near Fort Eben-Emael

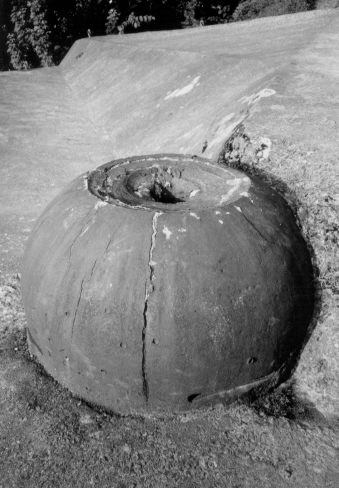
A cupola in Fort Eben-Emael after penetration by a shaped charge

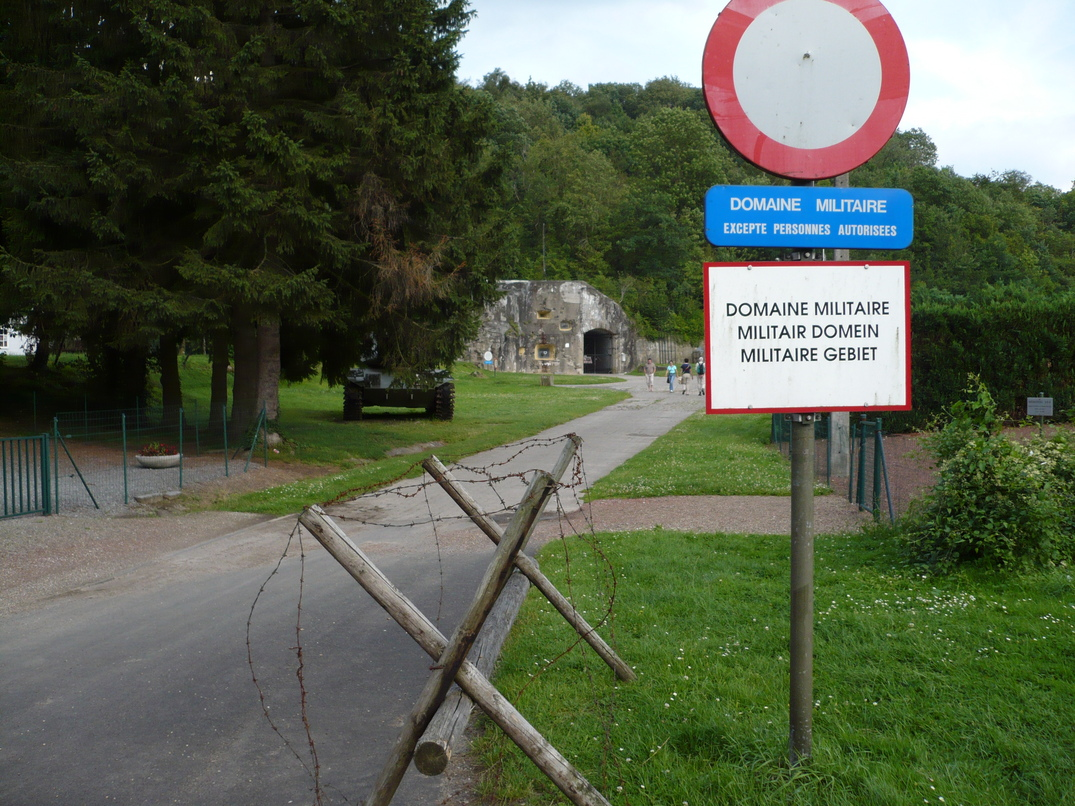
Entrance area, July 2007

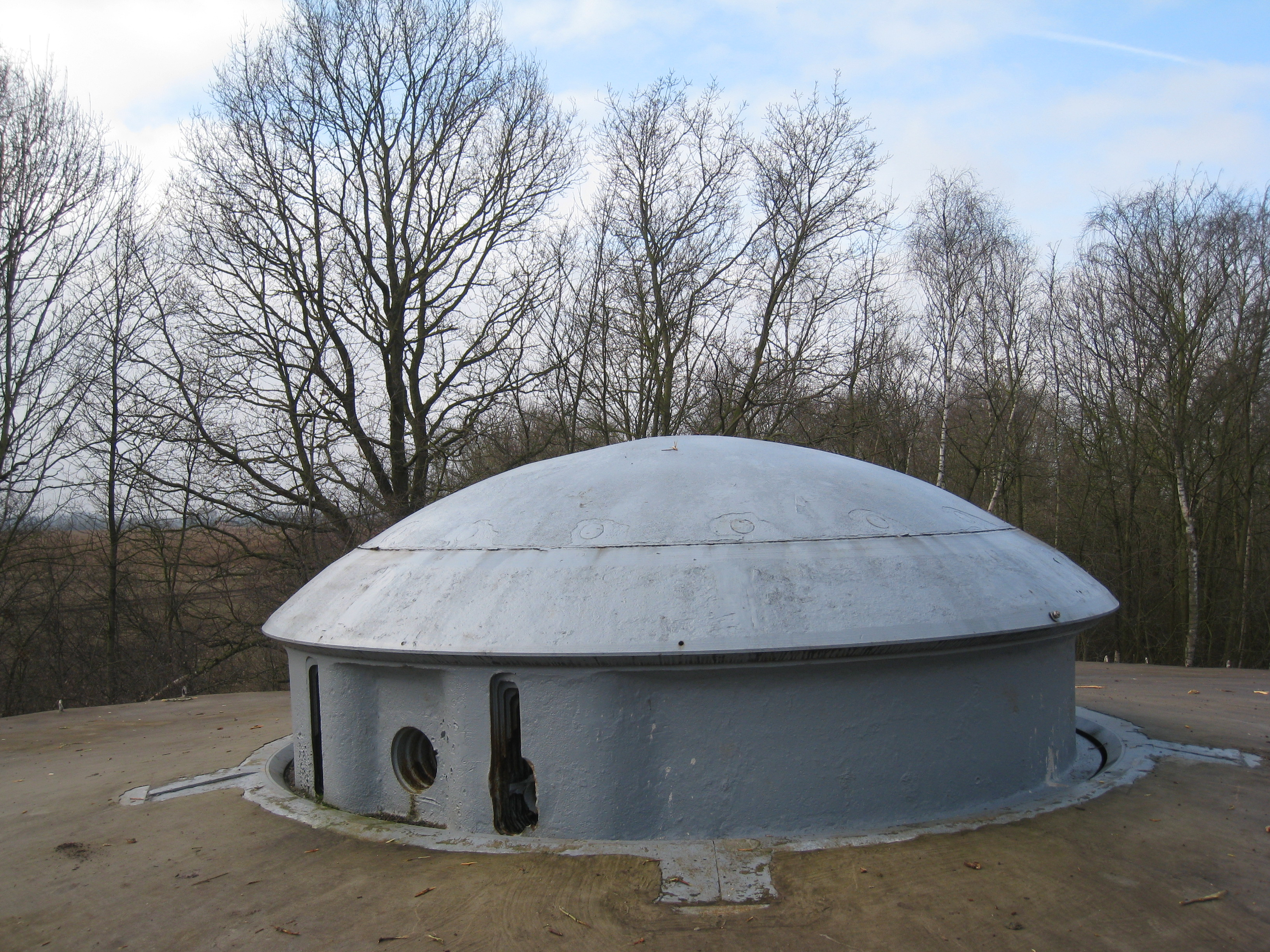
75mm turret, B.V

Fort Eben-Emael (French: Fort d'Ében-Émael, pronounced [fɔʁ debɛn emal]) is an inactive Belgian fortress located between Liège and Maastricht, on the Belgian-Dutch border, near the Albert Canal, outside the village of Ében-Émael. It was designed to defend Belgium from a German attack across the narrow belt of Dutch territory in the region. Constructed in 1932–1935, it was reputed to be impregnable and, at the time, the largest in the world.

The fort was neutralized by glider-borne German troops (71 men) on 10–11 May 1940 during the Second World War. This was the first strategic airborne operation using paratroopers ever attempted in military history. The action cleared the way for German ground forces to enter Belgium, unhindered by fire from Eben-Emael. While still the property of the Belgian Army, the fort has been preserved as a museum and may be visited.

== Location ==
The fort is located along the Albert Canal where it runs through a deep cutting at the junction of the Belgian and Dutch borders, about 20 kilometres (12 miles) northeast of Liège and about ten kilometres (six miles) south of Maastricht. A huge excavation project was carried out in the 1920s to create the Caestert cutting through the Caestert Plateau to keep the canal in Belgian territory. This created a natural defensive barrier that was augmented by the fort, at a location that had been recommended by Brialmont in the 19th century. Eben-Emael was the largest of four forts built in the 1930s as the Fortified Position of Liège I (Position Fortifiée de Liège I (PFL I)). From north to south, the new forts were Eben-Emael, Fort d'Aubin-Neufchâteau, Fort de Battice and Fort de Tancrémont. Tancrémont and Aubin-Neufchâteau are much smaller than Eben-Emael. Battice was somewhat smaller, but mounted heavier artillery. Several of the 19th century forts designed by General Henri Alexis Brialmont that encircled Liège were reconstructed and designated PFL II.

A great deal of the fort's excavation work was carried out on the canal side, where it was sheltered from view and provided a convenient location to load excavated spoil into barges to be taken away. The fort's elevation above the canal also allowed for efficient interior drainage and permitted natural ventilation, making Eben-Emael drier and better-ventilated than many similar fortifications.

== Description ==
Fort Eben-Emael was a greatly enlarged development of the original Belgian defence works designed by General Henri Alexis Brialmont before World War I. Even in its larger form, the fort comprised a relatively compact ensemble of gun turrets and observation posts, surrounded by a defended ditch. This was in contrast with French thinking for the contemporary Maginot Line fortifications, which were based on the dispersed fort palmé concept, with no clearly defined perimeter, a lesson learned from the experiences of French and Belgian forts in World War I. The new Belgian forts, while more conservative in design than the French ouvrages, included several new features as a result of World War I experience. The gun turrets were less closely grouped. Reinforced concrete was used in place of plain mass concrete, and its placement was done with greater care to avoid weak joints between pours. Ventilation was greatly improved, including an air filtration system for protection against gas attack, magazines were deeply buried and protected, and sanitary facilities and general living arrangements for the troops were given careful attention. Eben-Emael and Battice featured 120 mm and 75 mm guns, giving the fort the ability to bombard targets across a wide area of the eastern Liège region.

Fort Eben-Emael occupies a large hill just to the east of Eben-Emael village (now part of Bassenge) and bordering the Albert Canal. The irregularly-shaped fort is about 750 metres (2,460 ft) in the east-west dimension, and about 900 metres (3,000 ft) in the north-south dimension. It was more heavily armed than any other in the PFL I. In contrast to the other forts whose main weapons were in turrets, Eben-Emael's main weapons were divided between turrets and casemates. The 60 mm, 75 mm and 120 mm guns were made by the Fonderie Royale des Canons de Belgique (F.R.C.) in the city of Liège. The artillery turrets were so well-designed and constructed the artillerists were not required to wear hearing protection when firing the guns.

- Block B.I – entrance block with two 60 mm anti-tank guns (F.R.C. Modèle 1936) and machine guns.
- Blocks B.II, B.IV and B.VI – flanking casemates located around the perimeter ditch to take the ditch in enfilade with two 60 mm guns and machine guns.
- Block B.V – similar to II, IV and VI, with one 60 mm gun.
- Cupola 120 – one twin 120 mm gun (F.R.C. Modèle 1931) turret, with a range of 17.5 km. There were also three dummy 120 mm turrets.
- Cupola Nord and Cupola Sud – each had one retractable turret with two 75 mm guns (F.R.C. Modèle 1935), with a range of 10.5 km.
- Visé I and II – each houses three 75 mm guns, facing south.
- Maastricht I and II – each houses three 75 mm guns, firing north in the direction of Maastricht.
- Canal Nord and Sud – were twinned blocks housing 60 mm guns and machine guns covering the canal. 'Sud' was demolished when the canal was enlarged.
- 'Mi-Nord and Sud' are machine gun blocks (mitrailleuses) in the main surface of the fort. They were crucial in defending the top of the fort.
- 'Block O1' overlooks the canal and guarded the Lanaye locks. It housed a 60 mm gun and machine guns.

Underground galleries extend over five point one kilometres (3 mi) beneath the hill, connecting the combat blocks and serving the underground barracks, power plant, ammunition magazines and other spaces. Fresh air was obtained from intake vents over the canal.

== Personnel ==
In 1940, Fort Eben-Emael was commanded by Major Jottrand. There were around 1,200 Belgian troops stationed at the fort, divided into three groups. The first group was permanently stationed at the fort and consisted of 200 technical personnel (e.g. doctors, cooks, weapon maintenance technicians, administration staff). The two other groups consisted of 500 artillerists each. In peacetime, one group would be stationed at the fort for one week, and the other group would be in reserve at the village of Wonck, about 5 km (3 mi) away. These two groups would change places every week.

Except for some of the officers and NCOs, most of the men were conscripts. The majority of these were reservists and were called up after the invasion of Poland in 1939. Infantry training was poor, since the men were considered to be purely artillerists.

== 1940 ==
On 10 May 1940, 78 paratroopers of the German 7th Flieger (later 1st Fallschirmjäger Division) landed on the fortress with DFS 230 gliders, armed with special high explosives to attack the fortress and its guns. Most of the fort's defenders were taken by complete surprise. Eben-Emael's loss delivered a hard blow from which the Belgian Army did not recover.

== Present day ==
Fort Eben-Emael is now open to the public. While still military property, it is administered by the Association Fort Eben-Emael, which provides tours and activities.

== See also ==
- Czechoslovak border fortifications
- Maginot Line

== Bibliography ==
- Dunstan, Simon (2005). Fort Eben-Emael: The key to Hitler's Victory in the West. Osprey. ISBN 1-84176-821-9.
- Kauffmann, J. E. (2002). Fortress Europe: European Fortifications of World War II. Da Capo Press. ISBN 0-306-81174-X.
- McRaven, William (1995). Spec Ops: Case Studies in Special Operations Warfare – Theory & Practice. Presidio Press. ISBN 0-89141-544-0.
- Mrazek, James E. (1991). The Fall of Eben-Emael. Novato, CA: Presidio Press. ISBN 0-89141-406-1.
- "Eben-Emael: May 10, 1940". After the Battle. 5: 28–39. 1974. ISSN 0306-154X.
- Saunders, Tim (2005). Fort Eben-Emael 1940. Battleground. Pen and Sword. ISBN 1-84415-255-3.
