= August Coenders =

German engineer

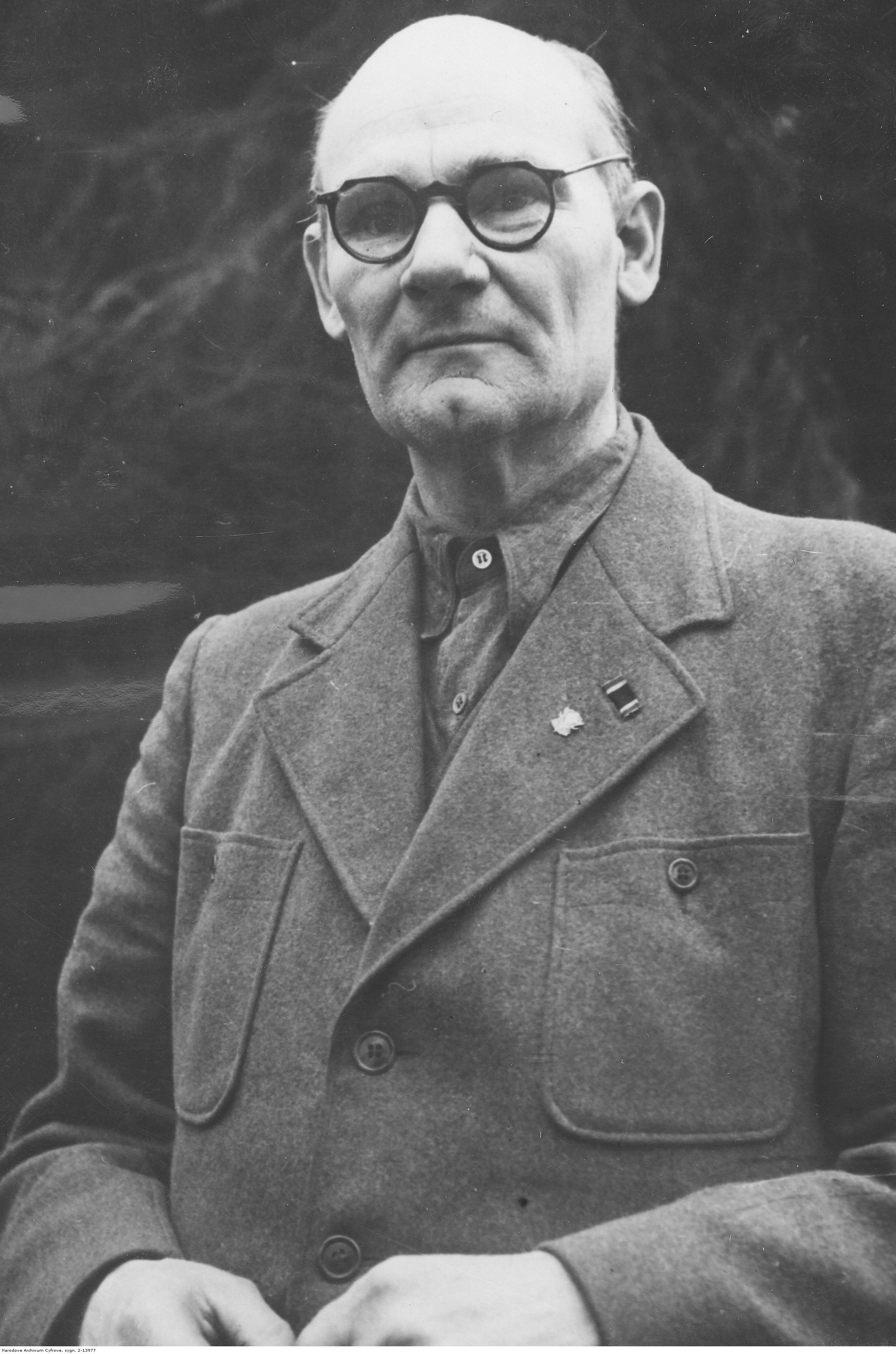
- August Coenders in 1944
- Born: 1890
- Died: 1974 (aged 83–84)
- Occupation: Engineer

August Coenders (1890—1974) was a German engineer working for Stahlwerke Becker AG during World War I, where he built a 20 mm antiaircraft gun. In the 1930s, he worked for several years in the UK, and in Puteaux, France as well as at Oerlikon, Switzerland. In 1936 Hermann Röchling brought him to Wetzlar, Germany, where he worked at Röchling'sche Eisen und Stahlwerke GmbH during World War II.

Cönders designed the Röchling shell that was tested in 1942 and 1943 against the Belgian Fort d'Aubin-Neufchâteau and the V-3 cannon. Very little is known of his life after the V-3 project.

He was involved in the development of several firearm designs: submachine gun, machine gun, Röchling Volksgewehr and Volkssturmkarabiner.
