= Röchling shell =

Bunker-busting artillery shell

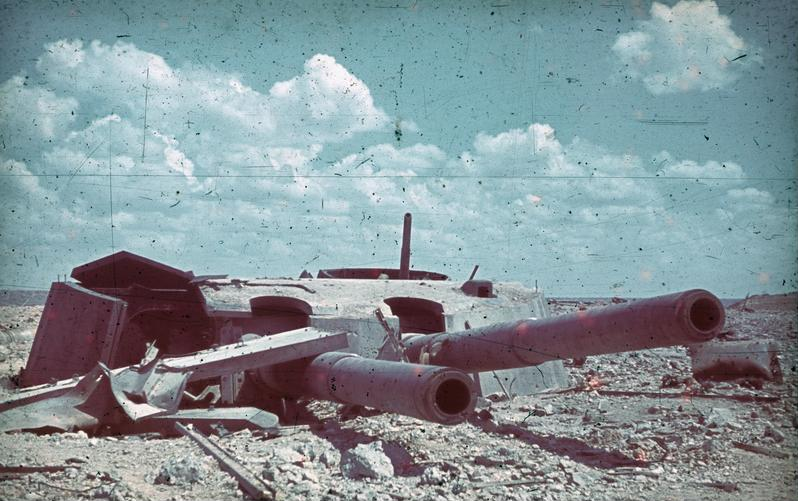
Turret of the Fort Maxim Gorky, near Sevastopol, against which Röchling shells were used

Röchling shells were bunker-busting artillery shells, developed by German engineer August Cönders during World War II, based on the theory of increasing the sectional density to improve penetration.

== Description ==
The subcaliber shells made from chrome-vanadium steel were able to penetrate much more than 4 metres (13 ft) of reinforced concrete roof before burying the shell through the floor and into earth. They resembled fin-stabilized arrow shells, but had a discarding flange acting as a driving band instead of fins. Despite high penetration, these shells had a low muzzle velocity, and thus a high dispersion, 36 m (118 ft) on 1,000 m (3,300 ft) range. As a result, they saw very limited use during World War II; only about 200 shells were ever fired even though 6,000 such shells were made for the very large howitzers like the 21 cm mortar.

Röchling shells were developed for the 21 cm Mörser 18, a captured French 34 cm railway gun 674(f), and the 35.5 cm Haubitze M1 only. In addition, many experimental HE shells were made for the 3.7 cm Pak 36 and 5 cm Pak 38 anti-tank guns.

== Use ==
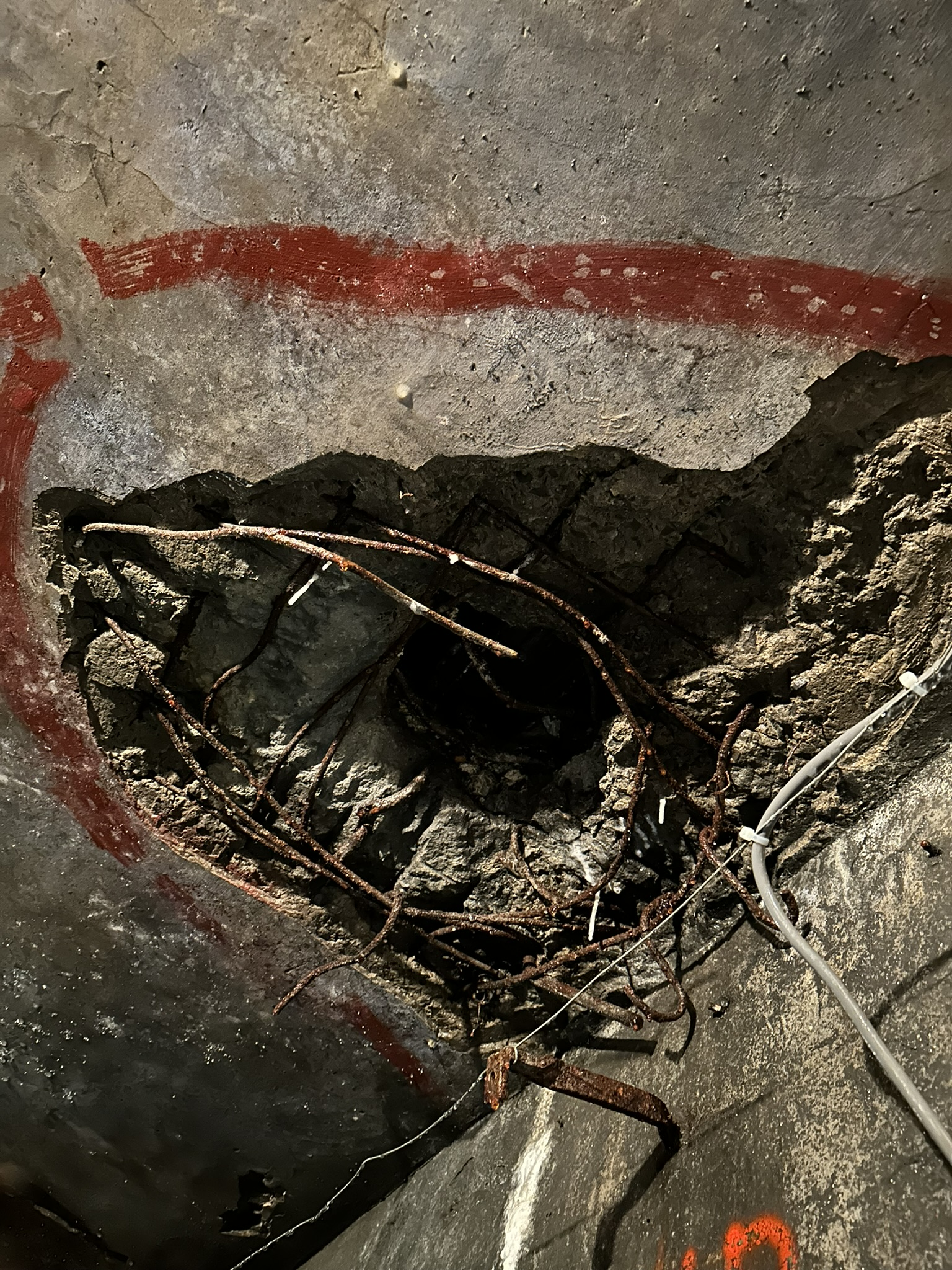
Impact of a Röchling shell that hit Fort d'Aubin-Neufchâteau. Picture is taken around 20 m underground.

Röchling shells were tested in 1942 and 1943 first against the Belgian Fort de Battice then against the Belgian Fort d'Aubin-Neufchâteau. They were also tested against the fortresses of Hůrka, Hanička and Dobrošov (today's Czech Republic), the Gössler wall, Toplitzsee (Austria) and at the Hillersleben test facility (Germany).

They were regarded as a German secret weapon, and there is speculation that their use was limited in order to reduce the chance of dud shells being recovered and exploited by the Allied forces.

Preserved small-size fin-stabilized prototype of Röchling shell (36 cm long) is since 2020 exhibited in the Museum of Czechoslovak fortifications, inside the fort Hůrka. Remnants of full-sized test shells are still visible in the walls of the fort.

== See also ==
- Kinetic energy penetrator
- Impact depth
