= Fort de Battice =

Belgian fortification to the east of the town of Battice, Liege province

Fort of Battice
- Fort de Battice
- Part of Fortified Position of Liège
- Battice, Belgium
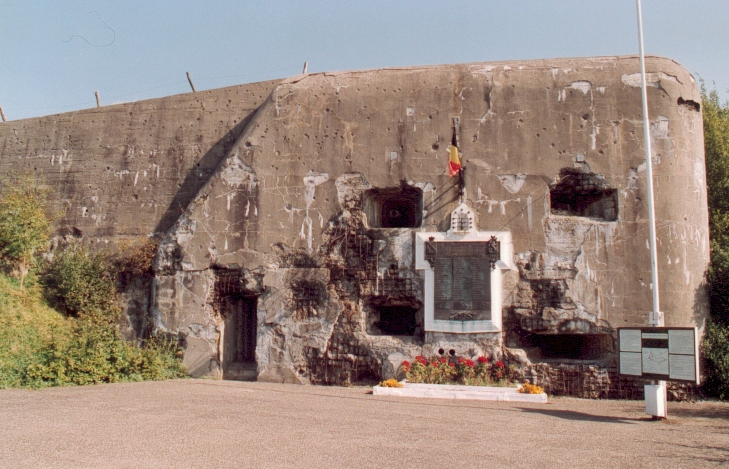

Site information
- Type: Fort
- Owner: Ministry of Defense
- Controlled by: Belgium
- Open to the public: Yes
- Condition: Preserved

Location
- Location within Belgium
- Coordinates: 50.64684°N 5.83393°E

Site history
- Built: April 1934
- Materials: Reinforced concrete, deep excavation
- Battles/wars: Battle of Belgium

The Fort of Battice (French: fort de Battice, pronounced [fɔʁ də batis]) is a Belgian fortification located just to the east of the town of Battice. The fort was built in the 1930s as part of the fortified position of Liège, augmenting the twelve original forts built to defend Liège in the 1880s with four more forts closer to the Belgian frontier with Germany. Battice is nearly as large as the more famous Fort Eben-Emael. Work began in April 1934, with some finishing work continuing in 1940 when war broke out. Following the successful German surprise attack on Eben-Emael, Battice held out against the Germans until 22 May 1940 (12 days). On 28 May 1940 all Belgian forces surrendered. Battice has been preserved and may be visited by the public.

== Situation ==
The fort is located between Fort d'Aubin-Neufchâteau to the north and the Fort de Tancrémont to the south, about 18 kilometres (11 mi) east of Liège. Tancrémont and Aubin-Neufchâteau are smaller than Eben-Emael and Battice. Collectively, the line was known as the Fortified Position of Liège I (Position Fortifiée de Liège 1 (PFL I) ), the original Liège forts constituting PFL II.

== Description ==
Map of the Fortified Position of Liège

The Fort de Battice was a greatly enlarged development of the original Belgian fortifications designed by General Henri Alexis Brialmont before World War I. Even in its larger form, the fort comprised a relatively compact ensemble of gun turrets and observation posts, surrounded by a defended ditch. This was in contrast with French thinking for the contemporary Maginot Line fortifications, which were based on the dispersed fort palmé concept, with no clearly defined perimeter, a lesson learned from the experiences of French and Belgian forts in World War I. The new Belgian forts, while more conservative in design than the French ouvrages, included several new features as a result of World War I experience. The gun turrets were less closely grouped. Reinforced concrete was used in place of plain mass concrete, and its placement was done with greater care to avoid weak joints between pours. Ventilation was greatly improved, magazines were deeply buried and protected, and sanitary facilities and general living arrangements for the troops were given careful attention. Battice, along with Eben-Emael, featured 120 mm and 75 mm guns, giving the fort the ability to bombard targets across a wide area of eastern Liège region. The 120 mm guns had sufficient range to provide artillery cover to Tancrémont and Aubin-Neufchâteau, but not with 75 mm guns, nor could the other forts' 75 mm guns or Eben-Emael's 120 mm guns reach Battice.

The Fort de Battice comprised at least twelve combat blocks just to the east of Battice, north of the present-day E40 highway. The roughly pentagonal fort has a surface area of about 13.5 hectares (33 acres), of a total site area of about 47 hectares (120 acres). The fort was armed similarly to Eben-Emael in both scale and equipment, only with fewer 60 mm anti-personnel guns. All of Battice's heavy artillery was housed in turrets, while Eben-Emael also disposed heavy guns in casemates.

- Block B.I, designed to interdict the N648 road and a railway line, equipped with two 60 mm guns, a machine gun embrasure, a grenade ejector and a searchlight.
- Blocks B.II, B.III, B.V and B.VII flanking casemates disposed around the perimeter ditch to take the ditch in enfilade
- Blocks A.Nord, B.IV and B.VI, artillery blocks each equipped with a retractable twin 75 mm gun turret and, at B.IV only, two machine gun cloches.
- Blocks B.Nord and B.Sud housed the fort's 120 mm guns, one per block in twin non-retractable gun turrets. Both turrets have been dismantled. Also called B.IX and B.X.

The fort also included counterscarp positions arranged to fire along the ditches with 47 mm guns, machine guns and grenade launchers, one designated B.IVce. Three blocks designated B.J., B.O. and B.W. provided air and access. B.W. was located above the main living accommodations and was the combat entrance, armed with machine guns, while J and O were emergency exits. All were outside the defended perimeter, above deeply buried galleries. Block B.I also served as an entrance, with truck access along the railway grade. The subterranean accommodations and utilities are outside the surface perimeter. The fort included a false 120 mm cupola.

The subterranean galleries total about 4,000 metres (13,000 ft) of passages buried between 20 metres (66 ft) and 28 metres (92 ft) below the surface, linking troop accommodations, a command post, ammunition magazines and utility plants.

== Personnel ==
In 1940 Battice was commanded by Commandant-Captain Guery of the 5th Battalion of the Liègeois Fortress Regiment. The battalion was commanded by Major Bovy from Battice. Major Bovy had been hospitalized on 6 May for heart problems, but returned to the fort on the 10th at 0430. He died of a heart attack at 0600 the same day.

== History ==
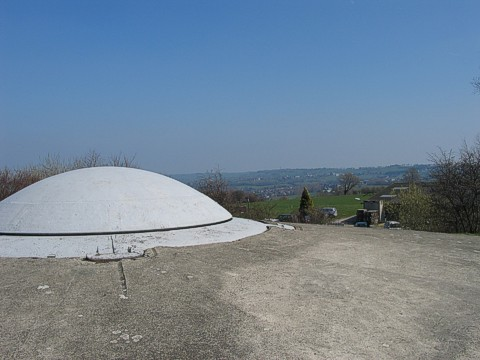
The surviving 75 mm gun turret at Block B.IV

The Fort de Battice was largely complete by 1940. On 10 May 1940 German forces attacked all four PFL I forts, having largely neutralized Eben-Emael by airborne assault and driving its garrison below, unable to operate the fort's turrets. Battice supported Tancrémont and Aubin-Neufchâteau with suppressing fire, as well as Fléron and Evegnée. German 305 mm mortars fired on Battice on the 12th without significant damage. German infantry attacks started on the 13th. On 21 May Block B.I's sally port had been struck by an aerial bomb. A nine-hour cease-fire was negotiated to remove the thirty dead and four survivors. After Aubin-Neufchâteau was forced to surrender, the German commander, General Fedor von Bock demanded the surrender of Battice and Tancrémont. Battice finally surrendered on 22 May after twelve days of fighting. 34 defenders were killed in action and 36 died while prisoners of war, out of a garrison of 939 personnel.

== Present day ==
The fort is preserved and open for public tours. Much of the fort's equipment and armament was removed during and after World War II. A memorial to the 36 dead is located on the side of Block B.I.
