= Tancrémont =

- Municipality
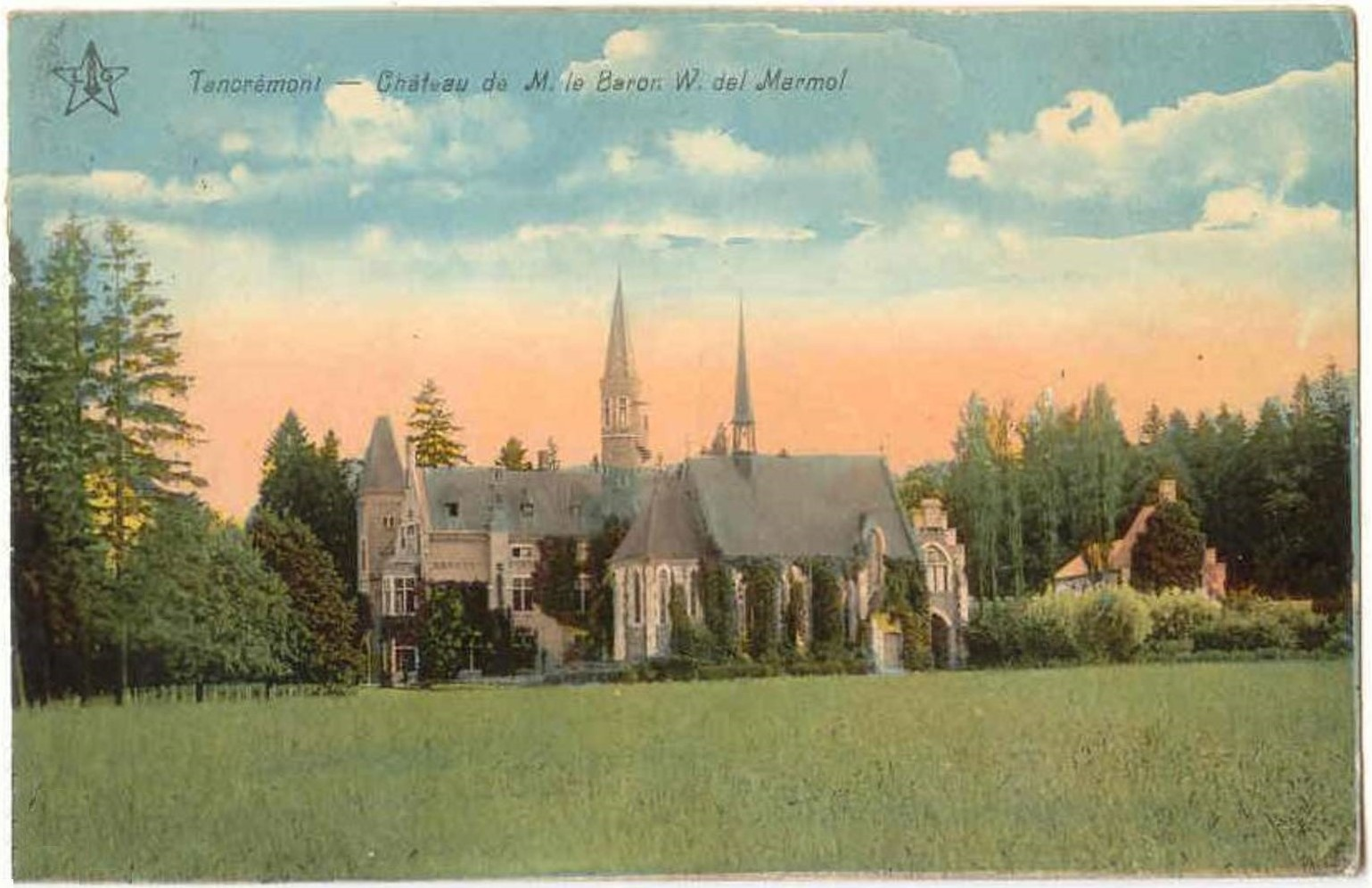
- Marmol's castle in Tancrémont
- Interactive map of Tancrémont
- Location in Belgium
- Coordinates: 50°33′N 05°47′E
- Country: Belgium
- Community: community
- Region: region
- Province: province

Tancrémont (French pronunciation: [tɑ̃kʁemɔ̃]) is a hamlet of Wallonia split between the municipalities of Pepinster and Theux, located in the province of Liège, Belgium.

The north side of 666 National Road that crosses the hamlet is part of the municipality of Pepinster.

== Cuisine ==
Tancrémont is known for the quality of its large cakes called "roues de charrette" (cartwheels, with a diameter of about 40 centimetres (16 in)) and particularly for the rice cakes. These cakes are sold or consumed in the local bakeries.

== Gallery ==
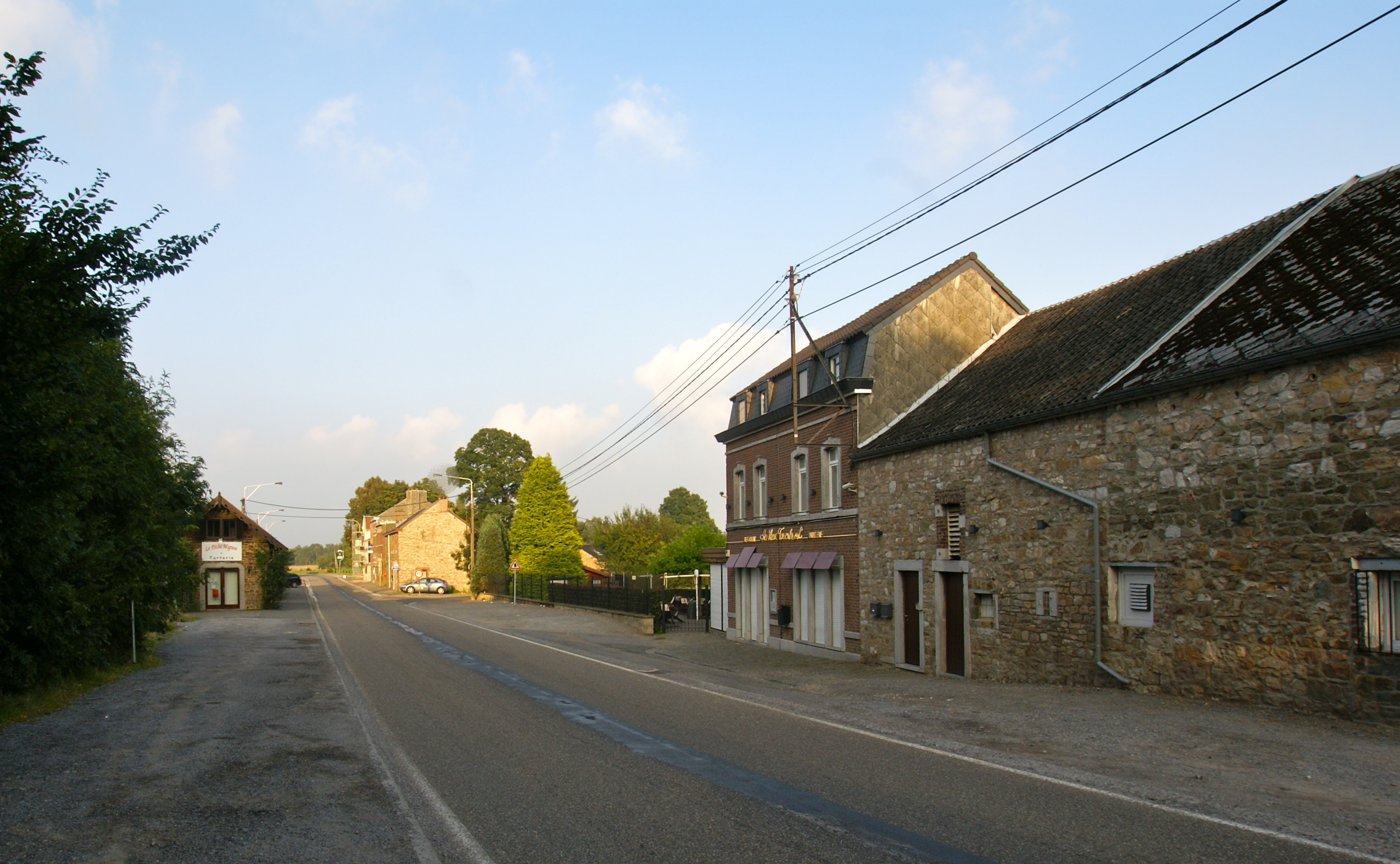
The National Route 666

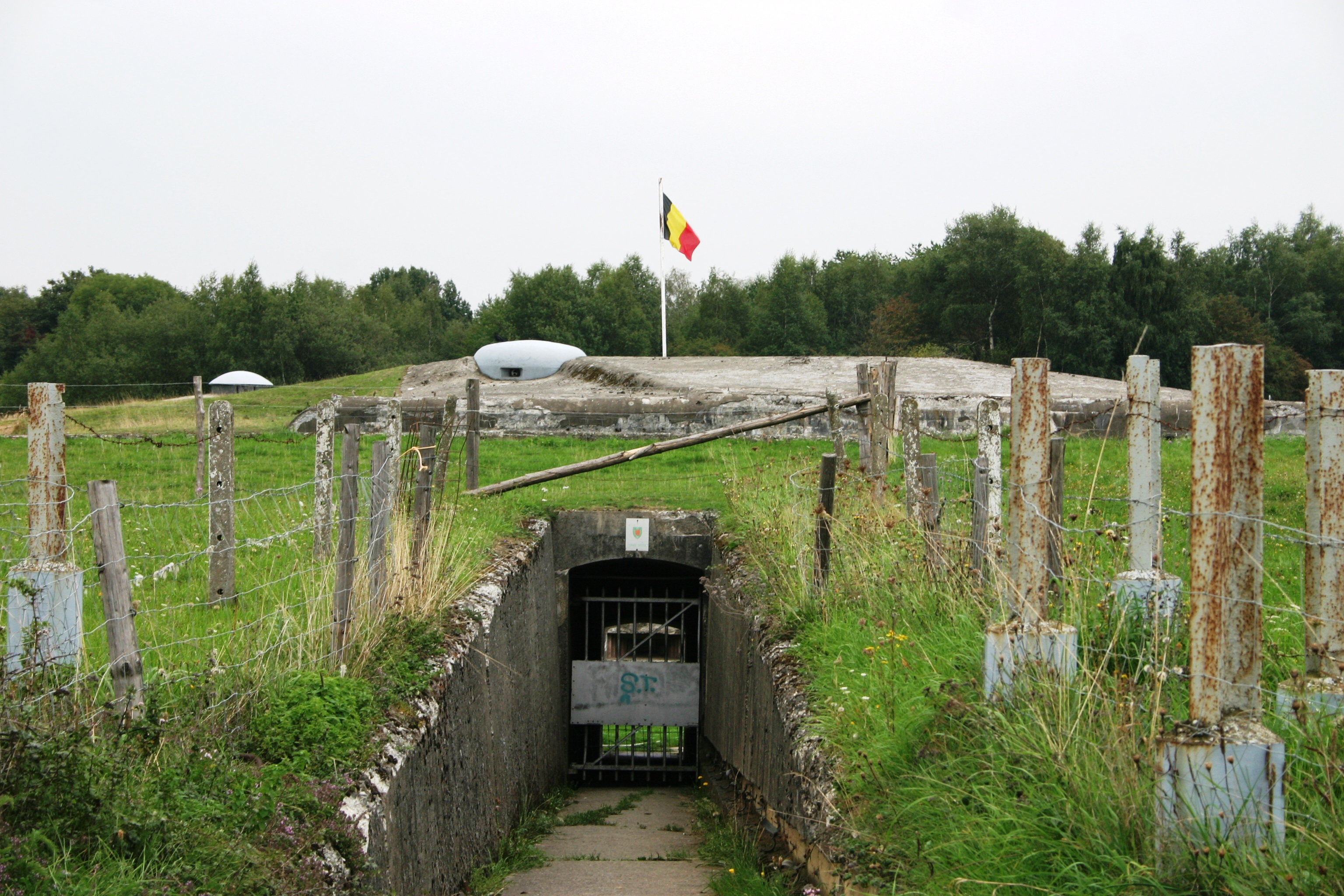
The fort

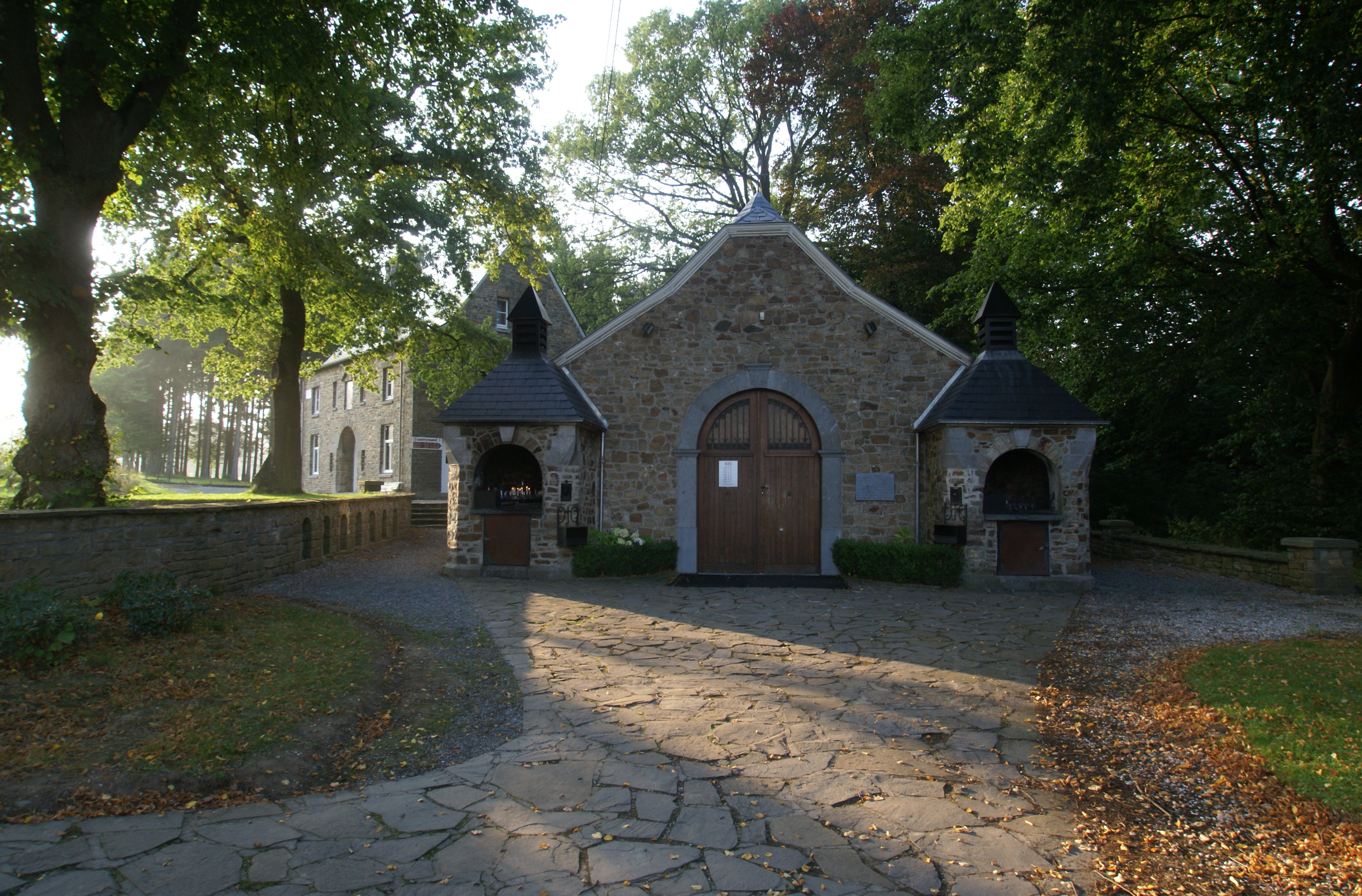
The shrine

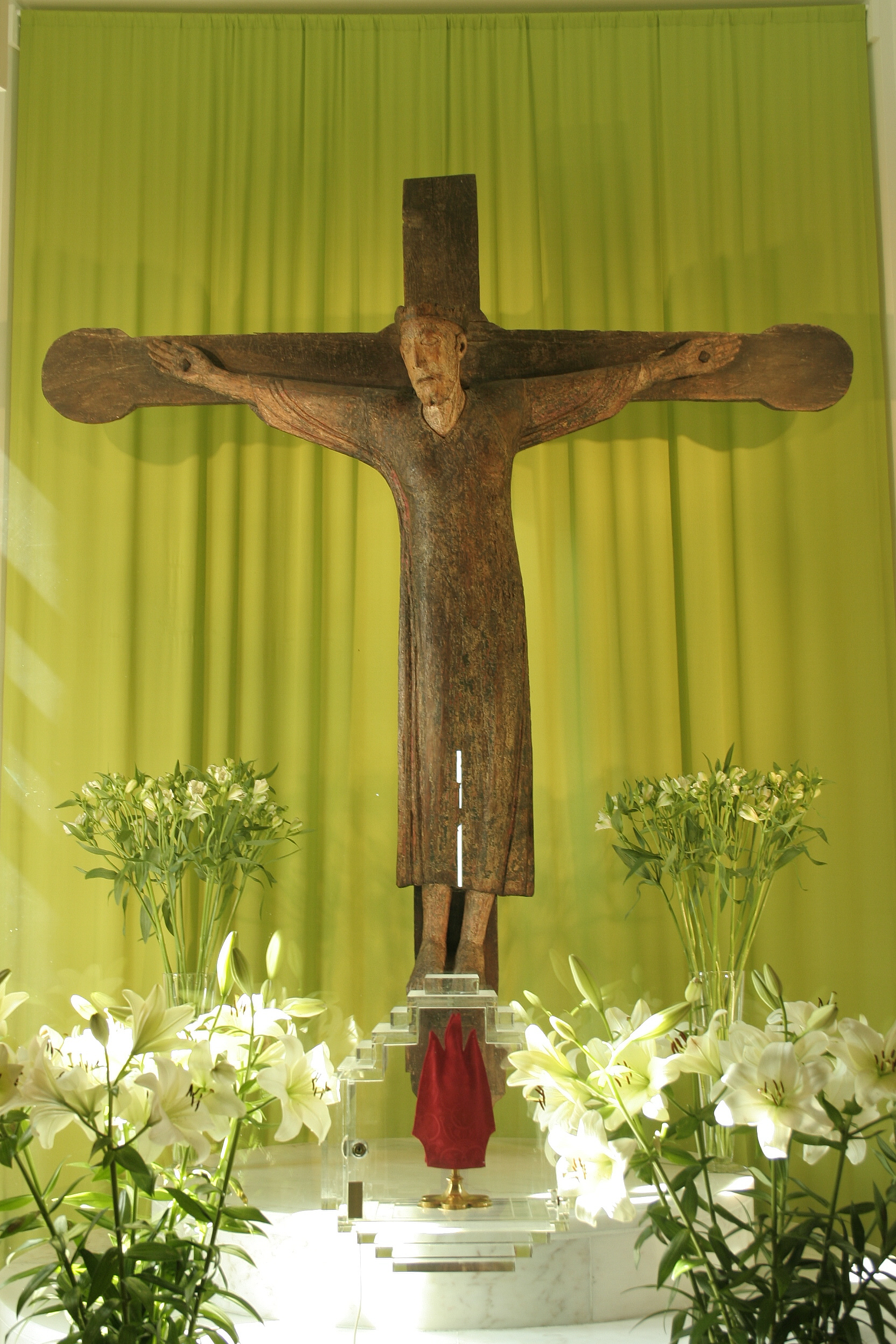
Christ of Tancrémont

== See also ==
- Fort de Tancrémont
- Shrine of Tancrémont
