= HIW VSK =

German prototype carbine and battle rfile

- Type: Bolt Action rifle Carbine
- Place of origin: Nazi Germany

Service history
- Used by: Volksturm

Production history
- Designer: August Coenders
- Designed: 1944–1945
- Manufacturer: Röchling Eisen-und Stahlwerke GmbH (Hessische Industrie Werke)
- Variants: Wetzlar Rifle; Wetzlar Carbine

Specifications
- Cartridge: 8×57mm IS (rifle); 8×33mm Kurz (carbine)
- Caliber: 7.9mm
- Action: Bolt-action (8x57); Blow forward (8x33mm)
- Feed system: 5-round internal box magazine.
- Sights: Iron sights

The HIW VSK were two prototype weapons, a rifle and a carbine, of German origin developed by Röchling Eisen-und Stahlwerke GmbH (Hessische Industrie Werke) and August Coenders in 1944. They were intended as Volkssturm weapons and the carbine variant used blow forward operation.

== Variants ==
=== Battle rifle ===
Chambered for the 7.92×57mm Mauser rifle round. It used standard 5-round stripper clips to fill the fixed internal magazine. To operate, the "bolt" handle is actually attached to the barrel, and pushed forward to feed a new round to a fixed bolt and breech face.

=== Carbine ===
Also known as Hessische Selbstladekarabiner (transl. self-loading carbine).

Chambered for the 7.92×33mm Kurz round. It used special 5-round stripper clips to fill the fixed internal magazine. The barrel is blown forward by drag of the bullet and propellant gasses and returns under spring pressure, chambering a new cartridge.
