= Fort d'Aubin-Neufchâteau =

Belgian fortification located near Neufchâteau

Fort of Aubin-Neufchâteau
- Fort d'Aubin-Neufchâteau
- Part of Fortified Position of Liège
- Neufchâteau, Liège (Dalhem)
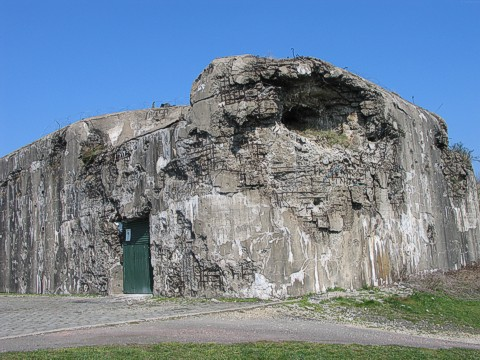
- Entry block with artillery damage

Site information
- Type: Fort
- Owner: Ministry of Defense
- Controlled by: Belgium
- Open to the public: Yes
- Condition: Preserved

Location
- Location within Belgium
- Coordinates: 50.72154°N 5.79025°E

Site history
- Materials: Reinforced concrete, deep excavation
- Battles/wars: Battle of Belgium

The Fort of Aubin-Neufchâteau (French: Fort d'Aubin-Neufchâteau, pronounced [fɔʁ dobɛ̃ nøʃɑto]) is a Belgian fortification located near Neufchâteau. The fort was built in the 1930s as part of the fortified position of Liège, augmenting the twelve original forts built to defend Liège in the 1880s with four more forts closer to the Belgian frontier with Germany. The fort surrendered to German forces in the opening days of World War II, following the dramatic assault on Aubin-Neufchâteau's sister fort, Fort Eben-Emael. Aubin-Neufchâteau has been preserved and may be visited by the public.

== Situation ==
The fort is to the south of Eben-Emael and north of the Fort de Battice in the line of the four 1930s forts, located about 18 kilometres (11 mi) east of Liège. Aubin-Neufchâteau and the Fort de Tancrémont are smaller than Eben-Emael and Battice. Collectively, the line was known as the Fortified Position of Liège I (Position Fortifiée de Liège 1 (PFL I) ), the original Liège forts constituting PFL II.

== Description ==
Map of the Fortified Position of Liège

The roughly triangular Fort d'Aubin-Neufchâteau was a development of the original Belgian fortifications designed by General Henri Alexis Brialmont before World War I, a relatively compact ensemble of gun turrets and observation posts disposed on a central massif of reinforced concrete, surrounded by a defended ditch. This was in contrast with French thinking for the contemporary Maginot Line fortifications, which were based on the dispersed fort palmé concept, with no clearly defined perimeter, a lesson learned from the experiences of French and Belgian forts in World War I. The new Belgian forts, while more conservative in design than the French ouvrages, included several new features as a result of World War I experience. The gun turrets were less closely grouped. Reinforced concrete was used in place of plain mass concrete, and its placement was done with greater care to avoid weak joints between pours. Ventilation was greatly improved, magazines were deeply buried and protected, and sanitary facilities and general living arrangements for the troops were given careful attention. With Tancrémont, Aubin-Neufchâteau was among the smaller of the new Belgian forts, armed with a maximum gun caliber of 75mm. These guns did not have sufficient range to provide mutual support between neighboring fortifications.

The Fort d'Aubin-Neufchâteau comprised several combat blocks surrounded by a defended ditch. Only the tops of the blocks were visible, with the majority of the fort sunk into the ground.

- Block B.III, a peacetime entry block with light arms, entered over a rolling drawbridge.
- Blocks B.I and B.II, two artillery blocks, each equipped with two retractable turrets mounting twin 75mm guns.
- Block B.M., a mortar block in the center, mounting three 81mm mortars and an observation block.

The fort also included counterscarp positions, C.I, C.II and C.III, arranged to fire along the ditches with 47mm guns, machine guns and grenade launchers. Block C.III, located just outside the perimeter at the entry, possessed a searchlight and cupolas or cloches for 47mm anti-tank guns. Block B.O. was an air intake and emergency exit, while Block B.P. was the peacetime entry block. Both were located some distance to the west of the defended perimeter, with the underground barracks, magazines and utility plants located between them and the main fort. The approximately 2,000 metres (6,600 ft) of subterranean galleries were buried between 20 metres (66 ft) and 28 metres (92 ft) below the surface. A Block K existed purely as a decoy.

== Personnel ==
In 1940 Aubin-Neufchâteau was commanded by Commandant-Captain d'Ardenne of the 3rd Battalion of the Liègeois Fortress Regiment, commanded by Major Herbillon.

== History ==
The Fort d'Aubin-Neufchâteau's construction started in April 1935 and was mostly complete at the time of the invasion in May 1940. At the time of the invasion the fort was commanded by Captain-Commandant d'Ardenne.

Aubin-Neufchâteau fired on German forces on the opening day of the German attack on Belgium, 10 May 1940. By the end of the day the fort was surrounded, enduring heavy artillery and aerial bomb attacks, as well as infantry assault. The fort sustained heavy damage to its surface installations and the Germans entered the perimeter on 15 May, but did not take the fort. A 20 May assault was held off with help from the Fort de Battice. Another assault the next day brought the fort's surrender, as it was nearly out of ammunition. There were significant casualties on both sides during the battle. The fort's garrison was taken by the Germans to Königsberg in East Prussia for five years. During the German occupation the fort was used for bunker buster bomb testing like the Röchling shell, causing major damage. The Belgian Army, whose property the fort remains, decided to leave the damage rather than attempt to restore it in 1989.

== Present day ==
The fort is in the process of preservation. It remains the property of the military. The fort is home to a colony of bats. A memorial to the 24 dead is located nearby.
