= Fort d'Évegnée =

19th-20th century defence for Liège, Belgium

- Part of Fortified Position of Liège
- Évegnée, Belgium
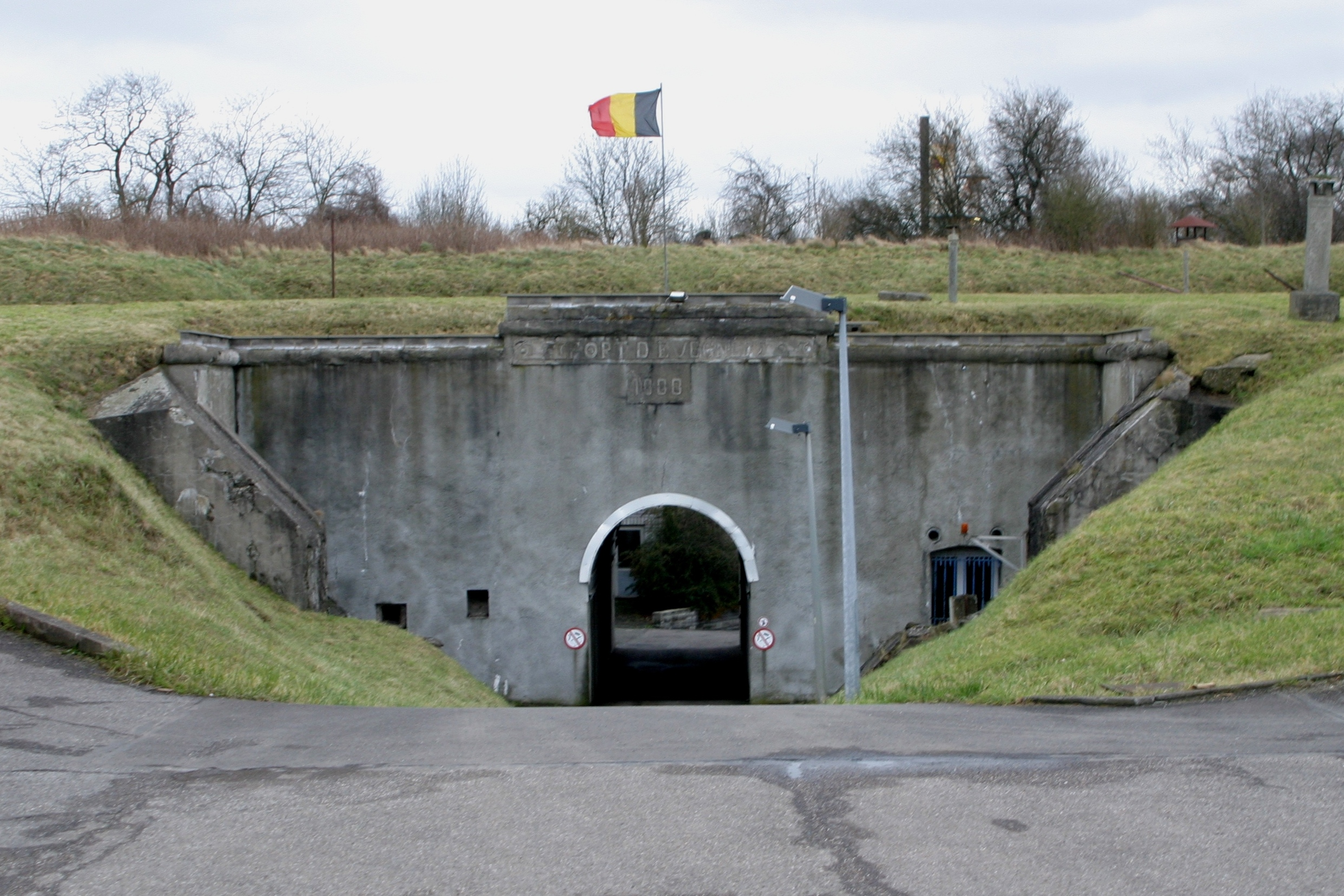
- Main gate of the fortification

Site information
- Type: Fort
- Owner: Forges de Zeebrugge
- Controlled by: Belgium
- Open to the public: No
- Condition: Industrial site used for explosives storage

Location
- Coordinates: 50°38′45″N 5°42′46″E

Site history
- Built: 1881
- Materials: Unreinforced concrete
- Battles/wars: Battle of Liège, Battle of Belgium

The Fort d'Évegnée (French pronunciation: [fɔʁ dev(ə)ɲe]) is one of twelve forts built around Liège, Belgium, in the late 19th century. The overall Fortified Position of Liège was a constituent part of the country's National Redoubt. Fort d'Évegnée was built between 1881 and 1884 according to the plans of General Henri Alexis Brialmont. Contrasting with the French forts built in the same era by Raymond Adolphe Séré de Rivières, the fort was built exclusively of unreinforced concrete, a new material, rather than masonry. The fort was heavily bombarded by German artillery in the Battle of Liège in World War I and again at the opening of World War II. It is now an industrial site, used for the storage and testing of rocket propellant.

== Description ==
The Fort d'Évegnée is located about 9.1 kilometres (5.7 mi) east of the center of Liège near the community of Évegnée-Tignée. With the Fort de Fléron, Évignée protects the Hesbaye plain and rail access from the direction of Aachen, as well as the Hervé road.

The fort forms an isosceles triangle whose base is 200 metres (660 ft) long and whose sides measure 225 metres (738 ft). A 6-metre (20 ft) deep by 8-metre (26 ft) ditch encircles the fort. The principal armament was concentrated in the central massif. The ditches were defended in enfilade by 57 mm guns in casemates resembling counterscarp batteries, firing at shot traps at the other end of the ditch. It is one of the smaller forts of Liège.

With the exception of the Fort de Loncin, the Belgian forts made little provision for the daily needs of their wartime garrisons, locating latrines, showers, kitchens and the morgue in the fort's counterscarp, a location that would be untenable in combat. This would have profound effects on the forts' ability to endure a long assault. The service areas were placed directly opposite the barracks, which opened into the ditch in the rear of the fort (i.e., in the face towards Liège), with lesser protection than the two "salient" sides. The Brialmont forts placed a weaker side to the rear to allow for recapture by Belgian forces from the rear, and located the barracks and support facilities on this side, using the rear ditch for light and ventilation of living spaces. In combat heavy shellfire made the rear ditch untenable, and German forces were able to get between the forts and attack them from the rear.

The Brialmont forts were designed to be protected from shellfire equaling their heaviest guns: 21 cm. The top of the central massif used 4 metres (13 ft) of unreinforced concrete, while the caserne walls, judged to be less exposed, used 1.5 metres (4.9 ft). Under fire, the forts were damaged by 21 cm fire and could not withstand heavier artillery.

== Armament ==
Évegnée's armament included a Grüsonwerke turret with a single 21 cm Krupp gun, a 15 cm Creusot turret with twin guns and two 12 cm Châtillon-Commentry turrets with two Krupp guns, all for distant targets. Four Grüsonwerke 57 mm gun turrets were provided for local defense. The fort also mounted an observation turret with a searchlight. Nine rapid-fire 57 mm guns were provided in casemates for the defense of the ditches and the postern.

The fort's heavy guns were German, typically Krupp, while the turret mechanisms were from a variety of sources. The fort was provided with signal lights to permit communication with the neighboring Fort de Barchon and Fort de Fléron. The guns were fired using black powder rather than smokeless powder, producing choking gas in the confined firing spaces that spread throughout the fort.

== First World War ==
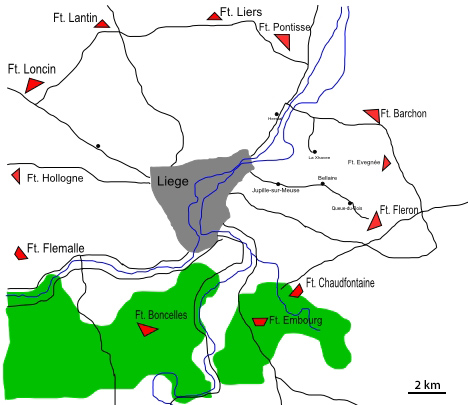
The Liège forts

Liège first came under attack on 5 August 1914, with the intervals around Évegnée the scene of some of the heaviest fighting. When the Liège's fortifications proved unexpectedly stubborn, the Germans brought heavy siege artillery to bombard the forts with shells far larger than they were designed to resist. Évegnée was one of the first targets. It was heavily bombarded starting 10 August, continuing until 0450 hours on 11 August. The fort surrendered at 1530, having lost its ability to resist.

Occupying the fort during the remainder of the war, Germans made a number of improvements to the fort in 1914 and 1915.

== Fortified Position of Liège ==
Évegnée's armament was upgraded in the 1930s to become part of the Fortified Position of Liège II, which was planned to deter a German incursion over the nearby border. The armament was upgraded with new guns in the turrets and an anti-aircraft battery. This was accompanied by improvements to ventilation, protection, sanitary facilities, communications and electrical power. An infantry shelter with an automatic rifle cloche was built at this time, as well as a remote air intake tower some distance away from fort, linked to the fort by a tunnel. The air intake survives, and is in particularly good condition.

== Second World War ==
Évegnée was attacked by German forces starting 16 May 1940, holding out until it surrendered on 19 May.

== Present ==
Évegnée is owned and used by the Forges de Zeebrugge for storage and testing of rocket propellant, and is not accessible to the public. The fort was purchased by FZ in 1971 and was stripped of military equipment before its conversion

== Bibliography ==
- Donnell, Clayton, The Forts of the Meuse in World War I, Osprey Publishing, Oxford, 2007, ISBN 978-1-84603-114-4.
- Kauffmann, J.E., Jurga, R., Fortress Europe: European Fortifications of World War II, Da Capo Press, USA, 2002, ISBN 0-306-81174-X.
