= 3rd Infantry Division (Belgium) =

- Active: 1913-1919; 1940; 1950s
- Disbanded: 28 May 1940
- Country: Belgium
- Branch: Belgian Army
- Type: Infantry Division
- Role: Infantry
- Size: Division
- Part of: III Corps (Belgium)
- Garrison/HQ: Liège
- Engagements: First World War; Battle of Liège; Battle of the Yser; Hundred Days Offensive; Second World War; Battle of Belgium

Commanders
- Notable commanders: Gérard Leman; Jules Jacques de Dixmude

The 3rd Infantry Division (3de Infanterie Divisie) was an infantry division of the Belgian Army that existed during the First World War (1914-1918) and the Battle of Belgium (1940) during the Second World War.

== History ==
=== World War I ===
At the start of World War I, the 3rd Infantry Division was known as ‘3rd Division’, since they were one of only Seven active divisions of the Belgian Army in 1914. The headquarters are at Liege. The 3rd Division was composed of the 9th, 11th, 12th, and 14th Mixed Brigades, all of which are formed from Regiments of-the-line. Cavalry support comes from the 2nd Lancer Regiment, with artillery from 3rd Artillery Regiment.

Commanders of the Division were :

- Gérard Leman (August 1914, POW),
- Victor Louis J. Bertrand (August - October 1914),
- Joseph Jacquet (October 1914 - February 1916),
- Jules Jacques de Dixmude (February 1916 - 4 October 1919)

=== World War II ===
At the start of the war on 10 May 1940, the 3rd Division was assigned the northernmost portion of the Fortified Position of Liège. Along with the 2nd and 7th Divisions it occupied the linchpin of the Belgian 'covering position', whose aim was to hold the Albert Canal and Meuse lines giving the French and British Armies time to deploy along the K-W Line. The 3rd Division took up well prepared positions between the modernised fortresses of Fleron, Barchon and Evegnée, disposing of several bunkers positioned in two lines.

However, when war broke out it became soon clear that the 7th Division to its far north suffered a major defeat and that the two divisions of the III Corps were in imminent danger of encirclement. By the end of 10 May, its units were summoned to immediately withdraw to the K-W Line. Unlike the 2nd Division, which was positioned south of Liège and could withdraw in relative safety, the 3rd Division's retreat was much more difficult.

As the 7th Division to its immediate north was all but wiped out, two battalions of the 1st regiment were ordered to take up position north of Liège to protect the retreat. Since Luftwaffe bombing was by now intense, this ad hoc force stalled in the Liège suburbs, where only scant cover was available. By the 11th of may, it was clear that any attempt to delay the German onslaught was futile and the Division was in full retreat along the Meuse towards Namur.

As Luftwaffe attacks did not relent and mobile advance guards of the German Armored divisions closed in, the Division lost much of its heavy equipment, while frequently retreating infantry units were caught up by German armor. At the Mehaigne river, French advance guards of the 1st Army had already blown up the bridges while units of the 3rd Division were still passing their lines. Stragglers had no choice but to leave behind their weapons and swim or surrender to the Germans.

By the 13th it became clear the 3rd Division was in no condition to fight on. Its remaining units were to regroup in Charleroi where trains would take them to the West of Flanders for refitting. All infantry regiments lost about a third of their troops, and had to be re-organized into three battalions. In the artillery regiment, some of its platoons lost all their pieces.

By 21 May, re-organisation was complete. The 1st and 12th regiments were briefly sent to the Scheldt river, to relieve the British 44th Division, in order to allow the BEF to shorten its line.

Since the Germans reached the English Channel briefly after that, the Division was called to man an improvised line at the Lys river, along with the rest of the Belgian army. There it was placed between Kuurne and Wielsbeke, just north of Kortrijk.

All three infantry regiments were placed along the river in the first line. Only the 2nd regiment of cyclists provided some reserve force. On 22 May, the 3rd Division started digging in behind a perilously shallow river Lys. Worse still, in some places the German bank overlooked the Belgian side and the attackers could profit from cover by the small town of Harelbeke at the right of the river. By the end of 23 May Belgian and German artillery started duelling. The 12th regiment was engaged by German small arms fire directed from the rooftops of Harelbeke.

Unfortunately, the 3rd Division was placed in front of the northernmost prong of the main German attack. Against the depleted 12th and 25th regiments, the Germans assembled four regiments supported by 300 pieces of artillery. After some intense fighting starting in the afternoon of 23 May the three regiments of the 3rd had to give way, creating a gap of 8 km in the Belgian lines. The 12th of the line was reduced to only 600 men, leaving behind app. 130 killed.

The 3rd Division was by now mostly a spent force. After the breakthrough, it was placed in reserve around Roeselare. A battalion from the 12th regiment was nonetheless, with the lone remaining AT gun, sent on the 27th to Tielt to support the disintegrating 16th Division in its last-ditch defence of that town.

By the Belgian surrender on 28 May, at least 452 officers, NCO and enlisted were killed in action.

== Structure 1940 ==
Structure of the division at the eve of the Battle of Belgium:

- Headquarters, at Liège
- Commanding Officer, 3rd Division - Lieutenant-General Gaston Lozet
  - 1st Line Regiment
  - 12th Line Regiment
  - 25th Line Regiment
  - 3rd Artillery Regiment (Belgium)
  - 3rd Bicycle Squadron (to the 1st lancers regiment)
  - 3rd Engineer Battalion
  - 3rd Signal Battalion
  - 1st Divisional Anti-Tank Gun Company (lorried)
  - 3rd Divisional Anti-Tank Gun Company (T-13) (to the 1st Regiment Carabiniers-Cyclists)
  - 3rd Divisional Supply Battalion
  - 3rd Divisional Field Hospital Battalion
  - 3rd Divisional Quartermaster Company
  - 3rd Divisional Anti Aircraft Company
  - 3rd Divisional Military Police Unit

== See also ==
- Belgian Army order of battle (1940)
