= Gérard Leman =

Belgian Army general

Gerard Mathieu Joseph Georges Leman
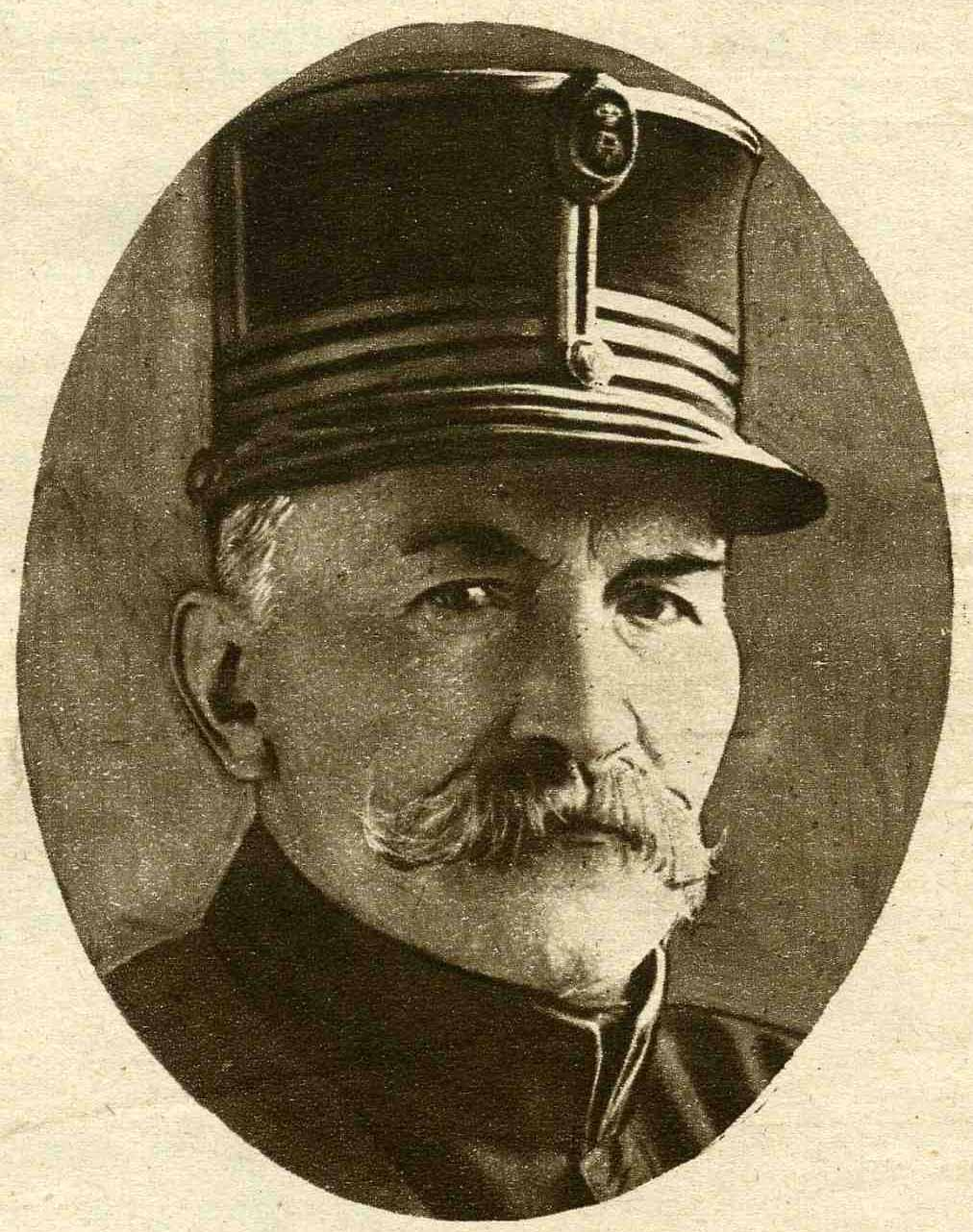
- Born: 8 January 1851; Liège, Belgium
- Died: 17 October 1920 (aged 69); Liège, Belgium
- Military career
- Allegiance: Belgium
- Branch: Belgian Army
- Rank: Lieutenant General
- Commands: 3rd Infantry Division
- Conflicts: World War I: Battle of Liège

Gerard Mathieu Joseph Georges, count Leman (8 January 1851 – 17 October 1920) was a Belgian general. He was responsible for the military education of King Albert I of Belgium. During World War I he was the commander of the forts surrounding the Belgian city of Liège. The German Forces had to use heavy artillery to break through the defences and capture Leman as a prisoner of War. He was released at the end of the war and died a hero, in 1920.

== Pre-World War I ==
Leman was the son of an artillery captain who was a professor at the Military School. He entered the Military School at Brussels, and when he left it in 1869 had acquired a reputation for brilliance. During the Franco-Prussian War he served in a Belgian observation corps. In 1882, he became a member of the teaching staff of the Military School, and both then and later, as head of the school, he exerted considerable influence on military matters, becoming famous as a mathematician. During this period he was responsible for the military education of King Albert I of Belgium and the Filipino general Antonio Luna.

== Preparing Liège ==
In January 1914, he was appointed commander of the forts surrounding the Belgian city of Liège as well as the 3rd Division of the Belgian army. Leman was determined to hinder the German advance as much as possible. Over 18,000 labourers were set to work building fortifications around Liège. During a visit by a Belgian minister, Leman was told that these projects would compromise the neutrality of Belgium. Leman was unimpressed and replied that Belgium would come to thank him if war would break out; if no war came "they could take away his general’s stars".

== Battle of Liège ==
In August 1914, German forces under the command of General Otto von Emmich appeared before Liège and summoned it to surrender. On Gen. Leman's refusal, the fortress was attacked, and the Battle of Liège began. Gen. von Emmich's forces were initially unable to break through his fortifications: only after they used very heavy artillery (Big Bertha and other heavy guns, brought from Germany and Skoda works), against the forts did they succeed in knocking them out. Leman was knocked unconscious by the bombardment, and was rescued by the Germans from under the debris of Fort Loncin. He was held as a prisoner of war in Germany until 1917, when he was repatriated to Switzerland due to ill health. As a token of respect, he was allowed to retain his sword. Leman insisted that the report of his capture mentioned that he did not surrender, but was captured unconscious.

== After the war ==
After the war, he returned to a hero's welcome in Belgium. He died in 1920, aged 69.

== Title and honours ==
Gérard-Mathieu Leman rose to the rank of lieutenant general and was made a count.

=== Military awards and decorations ===

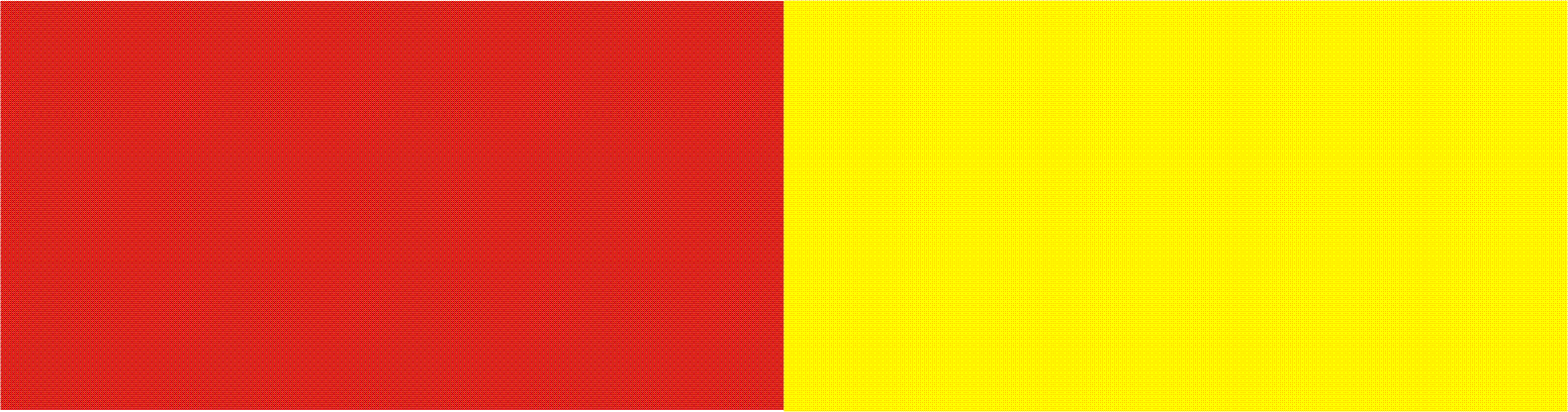

- Grand cordon of the order of Leopold with palm
- Grand officer of the order of the crown
- War cross WWI with palm
- Liege medal
- WWI Victory medal
- WW I commemorative medal
- Military cross, first class
- Commemorative medal of the reign of King Leopold II
- Knight grand cross of the order of St Michael and St George
- Grand cross of the legion of honor (France)
- Grand officer of the order of military merit (Spain)
- Commander of the order of the redeemer (Greece)
- Order of the double dragon (China)
- Order of the star of Romania (Romania)
- War cross with palm (France)
- War merit cross (Italy)
