= Liège Medal =

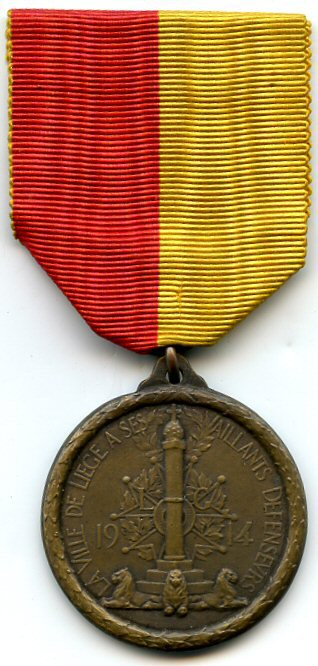
- Liège Medal(obverse)
- Type: Unofficial campaign medal
- Awarded for: 1914 defence of the city of Liège
- Country: Belgium
- Eligibility: Belgian military personnel
- Campaign: World War I
- Status: No longer awarded
- Established: April 1920
- First award: April 1920
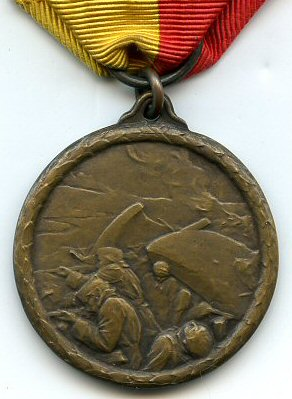
- Liège Medal(reverse)

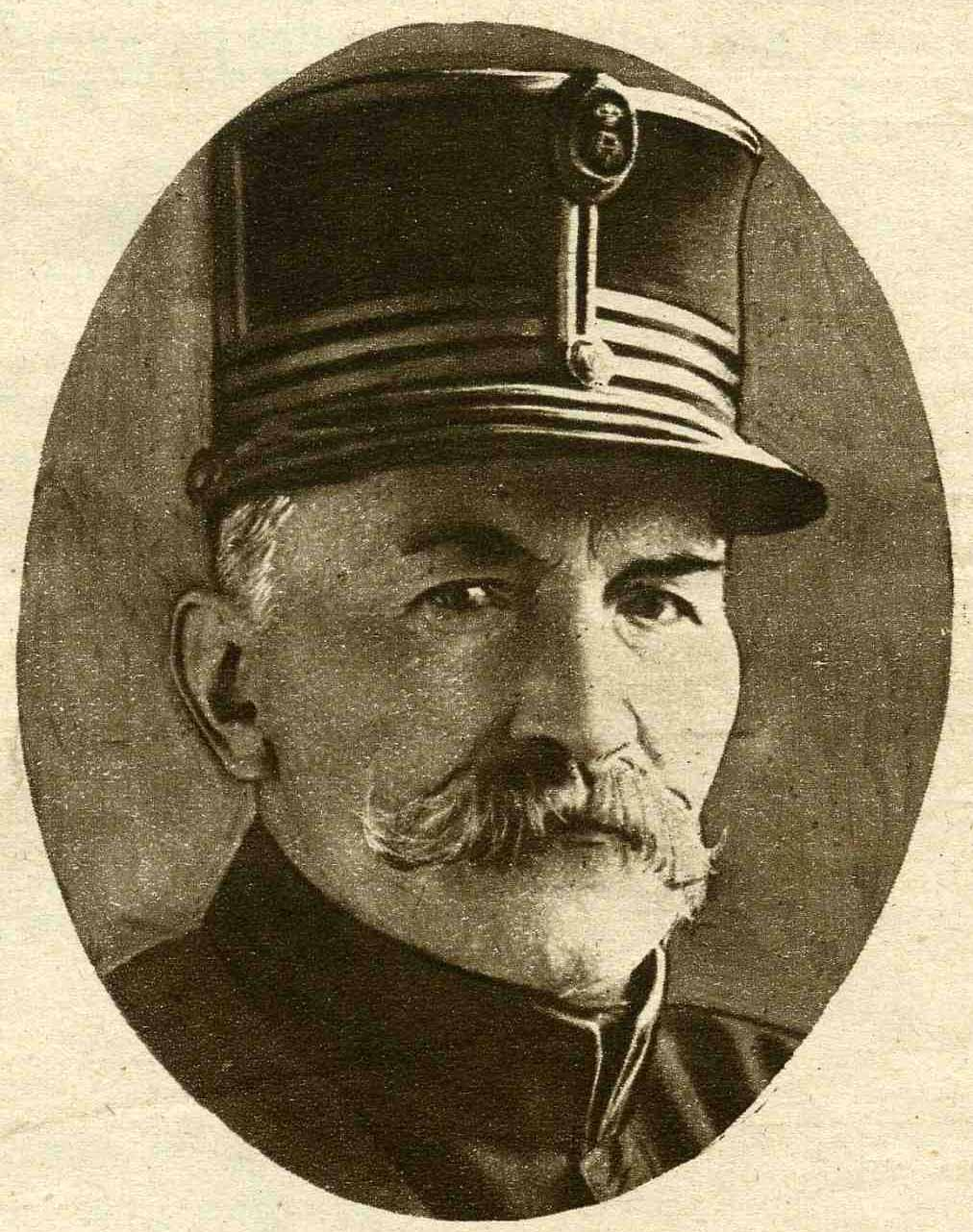
Lieutenant General Gérard Leman, heroic commander of the defence of Liège

The Liège Medal (French: Médaille de Liège, Dutch: Medaille van Luik) was an unofficial World War I bronze campaign medal issued by the Belgian city of Liège to its 1914 defenders against the German invaders. It was first issued in April 1920 during a large ceremony presided by the Duke of Brabant (the future King Leopold III) and Lieutenant General the Count Gérard-Mathieu Leman, military commander of the defence of Liège during the battle which raged from the 5th to the 16th of August 1914. The stubborn defence of the city forced the Germans to bring in specialised extra heavy artillery to take on the city fortifications.

== Statute ==
The Liège Medal was awarded to the military defenders of the city of Liège who took part in the Battle of Liège. It was also later awarded to residents of the city of Liège who were condemned to imprisonment by a German tribunal following the battle and received the Political Prisoners' Medal.

Although unofficial in nature being bestowed by the city of Liège and not the state, such was the national pride and prestige surrounding the valiant 1914 defence of the city that the medal was allowed for wear on the military uniform.

== Award description ==
The Liège Medal was a 35mm in diameter circular medal struck from bronze with a 2mm wide raised edge on both sides. Being unofficial, some recipients had theirs gilded or silvered. The raised edge bore laurel leaves on both sides along its entire circumference. The obverse bore the relief image of the Liège Perron superimposed over a decoration akin the French Legion of Honour and bisecting the year "19" "14". Along the circumference, the relief inscription "LA VILLE DE LIÈGE A SES VAILLANTS DEFENSEVRS" translating into "THE CITY OF LIÈGE TO ITS VALIANT DEFENDERS". The reverse bore the relief image of a battle scene including soldiers fighting on near a partly destroyed bunker on the bank of the Meuse river.

The medal was suspended by two interlocking rings, the lower one passing through a suspension loop atop the medal, to a 38mm wide silk moiré half red and half yellow ribbon, the colours of the city of Liège.

De ontwerper van de Medaille van Luik (Medaille de Liège) W.O.-I is van de hand van de Luikse beeldhouwer medailleur en kunstschilder Georges Pierre Charles Joseph Petit (Rijsel, 14 maart 1879 – Ampsin, 28 december 1958).

Beschrijving van de onderscheiding: De Medaille van Luik was een cirkelvormige medaille met een diameter van 35 mm, geslagen uit brons, met aan beide zijden een 2 mm brede opstaande rand. (Omdat de medaille onofficieel was, lieten sommige ontvangers de hunne vergulden of verzilveren.) De opstaande rand was over de gehele omtrek aan beide zijden voorzien van laurierbladen. De medaille was door middel van twee in elkaar grijpende ringen — waarvan de onderste door een ophangoog bovenop de medaille liep — verbonden met een 38 mm breed lint van zijden moiré. Het lint is half rood en half geel, de kleuren van de stad Luik. De letters L en G in het wapen van Luik staan voor Liège Gloriosa (Glorieus Luik). Sinds W.O.-I, worden de letters L en G op het kwartier van Luik officieel toegevoegd.

== Notable recipients (partial list) ==
- Lieutenant General the Count Gérard-Mathieu Leman
