= Battle of Liège =

Opening engagement of the German invasion of Belgium during WWI

- Part of the Western Front of the First World War
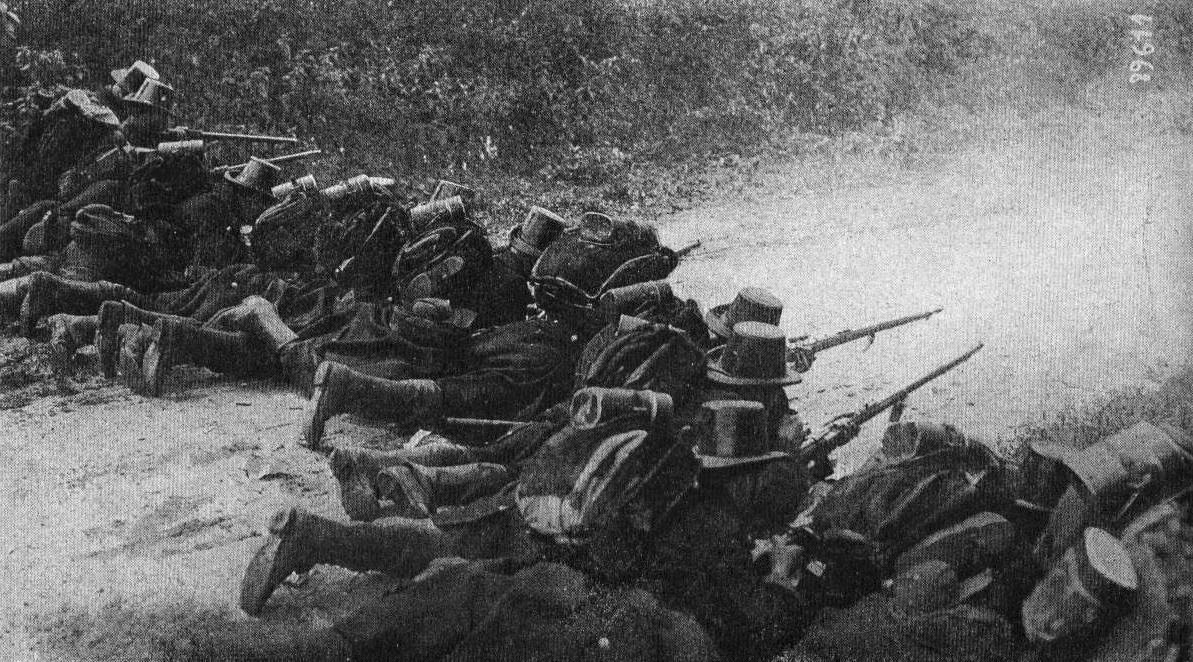
- Belgian troops defending a suburb of Herstal, north-east of Liège.
Date	5–16 August 1914
Location	Liège, Belgium
Result	See Aftermath section
Territorial changes	Germans capture Liège

Belligerents
German Empire	Belgium

Commanders and leaders
(German Empire) Otto von Emmich (German Empire) Erich Ludendorff	(Belgium) Gérard Leman (POW)

Strength
28,900–31,200 troops 140 guns	32,000 troops 280 guns.

Casualties and losses
3,300 (by 8 August)	6,000–20,000 casualties including 4,000 captured

The Battle of Liège (5–16 August 1914) was the opening engagement of the German invasion of Belgium and the first battle of the First World War. The city of Liège was protected by a ring of modern fortresses, one of several fortified cities intended to delay an invasion for troops from the powers guaranteeing Belgian neutrality to mobilise and join the Belgian Army in the expulsion of the invader.

The German 1st Army arrived late 5 August 1914 and captured the city on 7 August when Erich Ludendorff drove in and convinced the garrison to surrender. The surrounding forts fought on and several attacks by German infantry were costly failures. Super-heavy siege guns arrived and destroyed the forts one by one; the last fort surrendered on 16 August.

The siege of Liège may have delayed the German invasion of France by four to five days. Railways in the Meuse river valley needed by the German armies in eastern Belgium were closed for the duration of the siege and German troops did not appear in strength before the city of Namur at the confluence of the Sambre and Meuse rivers until 20 August. With the experience gained at Liège, the German 2nd Army completed the Siege of Namur in two days.

== Background ==
=== Strategic developments ===
==== Belgium ====
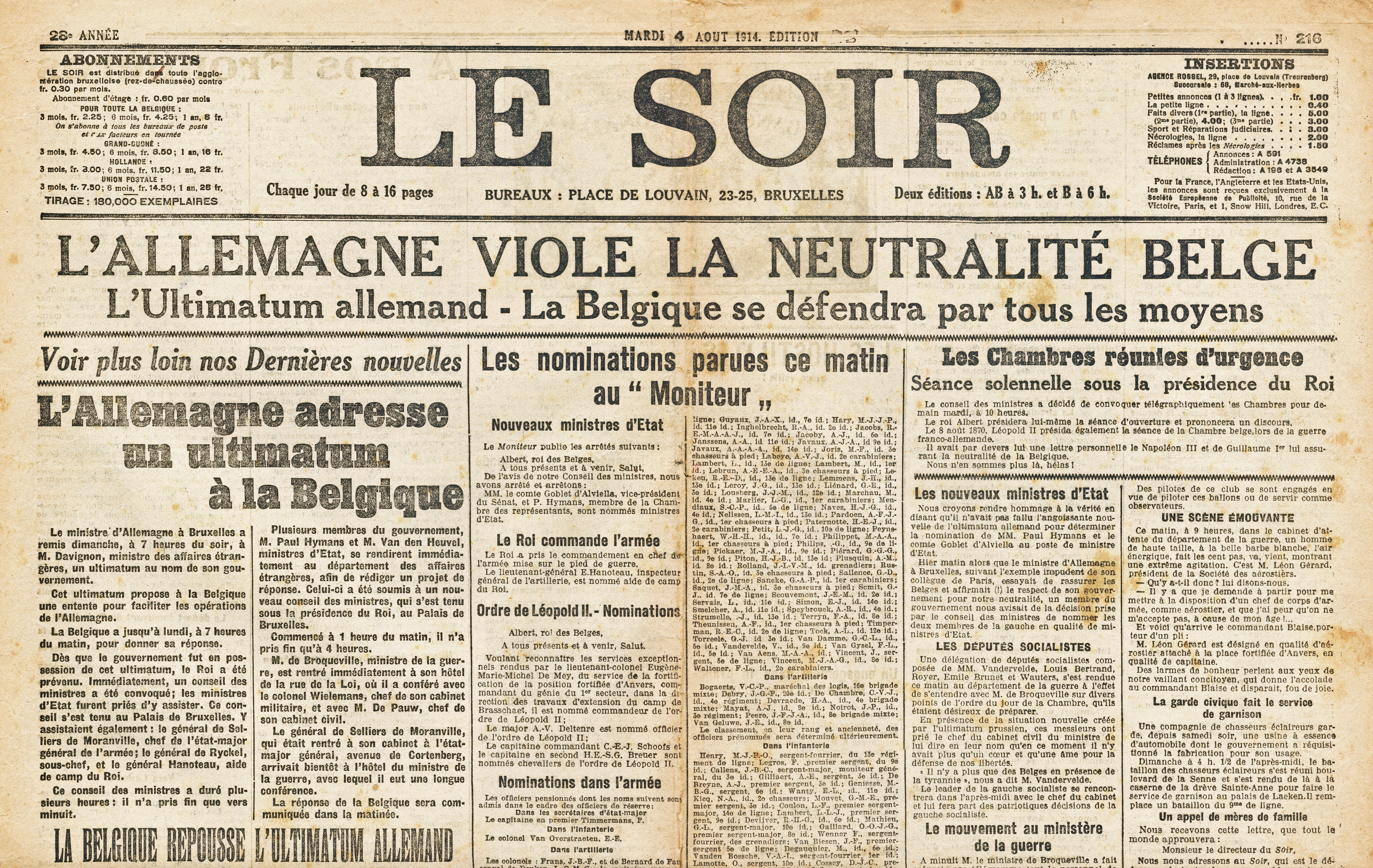
Headline in Le Soir, 4 August 1914

Belgian military planning was based on an assumption that other powers would expel an invader. The likelihood of a German invasion did not lead to France and Britain being seen as allies or for the Belgian government to intend to do more than protect its independence. The Anglo-French Entente (1904) had led the Belgians to perceive that the British attitude to Belgium had changed and that it was seen as a British protectorate. A General Staff was formed in 1910 but the Chef d'État-Major Général de l'Armée (Chief of the General Staff), Lieutenant-Général Harry Jungbluth was retired on 30 June 1912 and not replaced until May 1914 by Lieutenant-General Chevalier de Selliers de Moranville who began planning for the concentration of the army and met railway officials on 29 July.

Belgian troops were to be massed in central Belgium, in front of the national redoubt ready to face any border. On mobilisation, the King became Commander-in-Chief and chose where the army was to concentrate. Amid the disruption of the new rearmament plan, the disorganised and poorly trained Belgian soldiers would benefit from a central position, to delay contact with an invader but it would also need fortifications for defence, which were on the frontier. A school of thought wanted a return to a frontier deployment in line with French theories of the offensive. Belgian plans became a compromise in which the field army concentrated behind the Gete River with two divisions forward at Liège and Namur.

==== Germany ====
German strategy had given priority to offensive operations against France and a defensive posture against Russia since 1891. German planning was determined by numerical inferiority, the speed of mobilisation and concentration and the effect of the vast increase of the power of modern weapons. Frontal attacks were expected to be costly and protracted, leading to limited success, particularly after the French and Russians modernised their fortifications on the frontiers with Germany. Alfred von Schlieffen, Chief of the Imperial German General Staff (Oberste Heeresleitung, OHL) from 1891–1906, devised a plan to evade the French frontier fortifications with an offensive on the northern flank, which would have a local numerical superiority and obtain rapidly a decisive victory. By 1898–1899, such a manoeuvre was intended to pass swiftly through Belgium, between Antwerp and Namur and threaten Paris from the north. Helmuth von Moltke the Younger succeeded Schlieffen in 1906 and was less certain that the French would conform to German assumptions. Moltke adapted the deployment and concentration plan, to accommodate an attack in the centre or an enveloping attack from both flanks as variants, by adding divisions to the left flank opposite the French frontier, from the c. 1,700,000 men which were expected to be mobilised in the Westheer (western army). The main German force would still advance through Belgium to attack southwards into France, the French armies would be enveloped on their left and pressed back over the Meuse, Aisne, Somme, Oise, Marne and Seine rivers, unable to withdraw into central France. The French would either be annihilated by the manoeuvre from the north or it would create conditions for victory in the centre or in Lorraine on the common border.

==== Declarations of war ====
At midnight on 31 July/1 August, the German government sent an ultimatum to Russia and announced a state of Kriegsgefahr during the day; the Ottoman government ordered mobilisation and the London Stock Exchange closed. On 1 August the British government ordered the mobilisation of the navy, the German government ordered general mobilisation and declared war on Russia. Hostilities commenced on the Polish frontier, the French government ordered general mobilisation and next day the German government sent an ultimatum to Belgium, demanding passage through Belgian territory, as German troops crossed the frontier of Luxembourg. Military operations began on the French frontier, Libau was bombarded by a German light cruiser SMS Augsburg and the British government guaranteed naval protection for French coasts. On 3 August the Belgian Government refused German demands and the British Government guaranteed military support to Belgium, should Germany invade. Germany declared war on France, the British government ordered general mobilisation and Italy declared neutrality. On 4 August the British government sent an ultimatum to Germany and declared war on Germany at midnight on 4/5 August, Central European Time. Belgium severed diplomatic relations with Germany and Germany declared war on Belgium. German troops crossed the Belgian frontier and attacked Liège.

=== Tactical developments ===
==== Liège forts ====
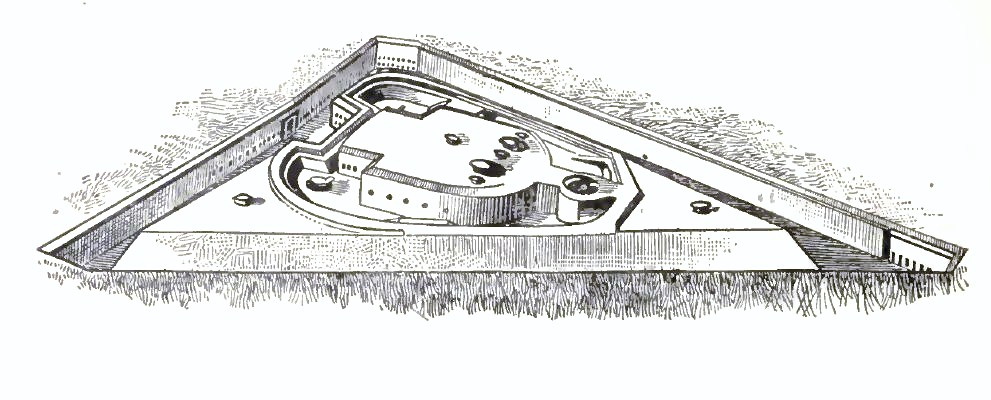
Triangular Brialmont fort, 1914

Liège is situated at the confluence of the Meuse which, at the city, flows through a deep ravine and the Ourthe River, between the Ardennes to the south and Maastricht (in the Netherlands) and Flanders to the north and west. The city lies on the main rail lines from Germany to Brussels and Paris, which Schlieffen and Moltke planned to use in an invasion of France. Much industrial development had taken place in Liège and the vicinity, which presented a considerable obstacle to an invading force. The main defences were a ring of twelve forts 6–10 km (3.7–6.2 mi) from the city, built in 1892 by Henri Alexis Brialmont, the leading fortress engineer of the nineteenth century. The forts were sited about 4 km (2.5 mi) apart to be mutually supporting but had been designed for frontal, rather than all-round defence.

The forts were five large triangular (Barchon, Fléron, Boncelles, Loncin and Pontisse), four small triangular (Evegnée, Hollogne, Lantin and Liers) and two small square forts (Chaudfontaine and Embourg). The forts were built of concrete, with a surrounding ditch and barbed-wire entanglements; the superstructures were buried and only mounds of concrete or masonry and soil were visible. The large forts had two armoured turrets with two 210 mm (8.3 in) guns each, one turret with two 150 mm (5.9 in) guns and two cupolas with a 210 mm (8.3 in) howitzer each. Four retractable turrets contained a 57 mm (2.2 in) quick-firer each, two before the citadel and two at the base. A retractable searchlight was built behind the 150 mm turret with a range of 2–3 km (1.2–1.9 mi). Small forts had a 210 mm (8.3 in) howitzer cupola and three of the quick-firers. The heavy guns and quick-firers used black powder ammunition, long superseded in other armies, which raised clouds of smoke and obscured the view of the gunners. The 150 mm (5.9 in) guns had the greatest range at 8,500 m (9,300 yd) but the black powder smoke limited the realistic range to about 1,500 m (1,600 yd). The forts contained magazines for the storage of ammunition, crew quarters for up to 500 men and electric generators for lighting. Provision had been made for the daily needs of the fortress troops but the latrines, showers, kitchens and the morgue had been built in the counterscarp, which could become untenable if fumes from exploding shells accumulated, because the forts were ventilated naturally.

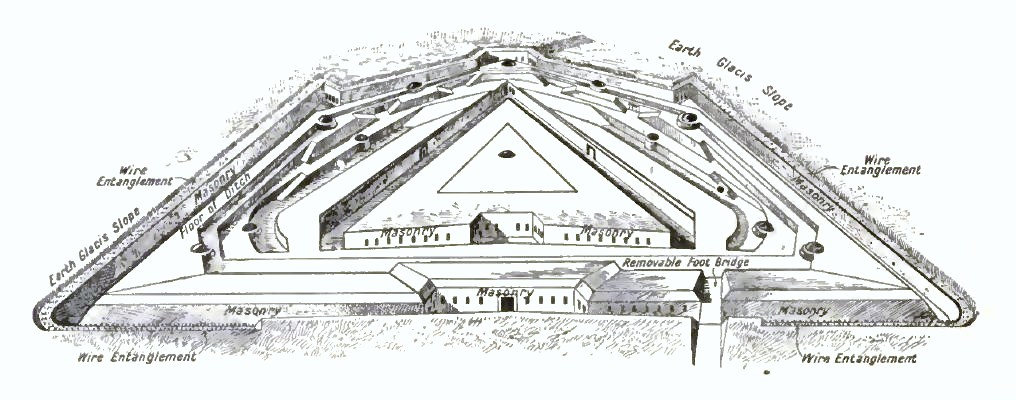
Pentagonal Brialmont fort, 1914

The forts could communicate with the outside by telephone and telegraph but the wires were not buried. Smaller fortifications and trench lines in the gaps between the forts had been planned by Brialmont but had not been built. The fortress troops were not at full strength and many men were drawn from local guard units, who had received minimal training due to the reorganisation of the Belgian army begun in 1911, which was not scheduled to be complete until 1926. The forts also had c. 26,000 soldiers and 72 field guns of the 3rd Infantry Division and 15th Infantry Brigade to defend the gaps between forts, c. 6,000 fortress troops and members of the paramilitary Garde Civique, equipped with rifles and machine-guns. The garrison of c. 32,000 men and 280 guns was insufficient to man the forts and field fortifications. In early August 1914, the garrison commander was unsure of the troops which he would have at his disposal, since until 6 August, it was possible that all of the Belgian army would advance towards the Meuse.

The terrain in the fortress zone was difficult to observe from the forts because many ravines ran between them. Interval defences had been built just before the battle but were insufficient to stop German infiltration. The forts were also vulnerable to attack from the rear, the direction from which the German bombardments were fired. The forts had been designed to withstand shelling from 210 mm (8.3 in) guns which, in 1890, were the largest mobile artillery in the world but the concrete used was not of the best quality and by 1914 the German army had the first of the much larger 420 mm howitzers, (L/12 420 mm (17 in) M-Gerät 14 Kurze Marine-Kanone) and could call on Austro-Hungarian 305 mm howitzers (Mörser M. 11). The Belgian 3rd Division (Lieutenant-General Gérard Léman) along with the attached 15th Infantry Brigade defended Liège. The division comprised five brigades and various other formations with c. 32,000 troops and 280 guns. (Note: The 9th Mixed Brigade comprised the 9th and 29th Infantry regiments, the 43rd, 44th and 45th Artillery batteries. The 11th Mixed Brigade with the 11th and 31st Regiments of the Line and the 37th, 38th and 39th Artillery Batteries. The 12th Mixed Brigade, including the 12th and 32nd Regiments of the Line, along with the 40th, 41st and 42nd Artillery Batteries, the 14th Mixed Brigade with the 14th and 34th Regiments of the Line and the 46th, 47th and 48th Artillery Batteries and the 15th Mixed Brigade from 5 August, with the 1st and 4th Chasseurs à Pied Regiments, along with the 61st, 62nd and 63rd Artillery Batteries. The Fortress Guards comprised the 9th, 11th, 12th and 14th Reserve Infantry Regiments, an artillery regiment, four Reserve batteries and various other troops, the 3rd Artillery Regiment and the 40th, 49th and 51st Artillery Batteries with the 3rd Engineer Battalion and the 3rd Telegraphist Section. The cavalry component was the 2nd Regiment of Lancers.)

==== Army of the Meuse ====
The Army of the Meuse (General Otto von Emmich) consisted of the 11th Brigade of III Corps (Major-General Friedrich von Wachter), the 14th Brigade of IV Corps (Major-General Friedrich von Wussow), the 27th Brigade of VII Corps (Colonel Benno von Massow), the 34th Brigade of IX Corps (Major-General Richard von Kraewel), the 38th Brigade of X Corps (Colonel Oertzen) and the 43rd Brigade of XI Corps (Major-General Hülsen). The cavalry component consisted of Höheres Kavallerie-Kommando II (II Cavalry Corps [HKK II]), Lieutenant-General Georg von der Marwitz), consisting of the 2nd (Major-General Friedrich von Krane), 4th (Lieutenant-General Otto von Garnier) and the 9th (Major-General Karl-Ulrich von Bülow) cavalry divisions. (A German Cavalry Corps was not an army corps in the conventional sense but the largest German cavalry unit that operated in 1914 and was known as a Höheres Kavallerie-Kommando.) The Army of the Meuse had c. 59,800 troops with 100 guns and howitzers, accompanied by Erich Ludendorff as an observer for the General Staff.

== Prelude ==
=== German preparations ===
In August 1914, the Germans realised that the garrison at Liège would be larger than anticipated and that prompt mobilisation had given the Belgians time to make progress on the defences between the forts. Six reinforced brigades and II Cavalry Corps under the X Corps commander were to be ready on 4 August, the third day of mobilisation, at Aachen, Eupen, and Malmedy to conduct the coup de main. The 2nd Army Quartermaster General, Major-General Erich Ludendorff, was assigned to the X Corps staff as he was familiar with the plan, having been the Chief of the Deployment Department of the General Staff. On the night of 5/6 August the force was to make a surprise attack, penetrate the fortress ring, capture the town and the road and rail facilities. The invasion began on 4 August; aeroplanes, cavalry and cyclists went ahead of the infantry, with leaflets requesting calm from Belgian civilians. On the right flank, II Cavalry Corps with the cavalry Division Garnier and the 34th Infantry Brigade, advanced to take the crossings over the Meuse at Visé, to reconnoitre towards Brussels and Antwerp and prevent the Belgian army from interfering with the attack on Liège.

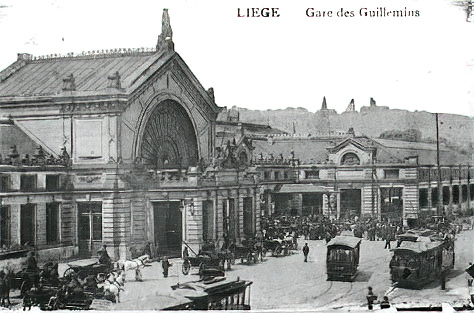
View of the Guillemins railway station in Liège, 1905

The advance into Belgium took place in suffocating hot weather; roadblocks slowed German progress; cavalry found that the bridge at Visé had been blown and were engaged by small-arms fire from the west bank. Jäger pushed the Belgians out of the village but the bridging train of the 34th Brigade was delayed and fire from the Liège forts made the area untenable. The 27th, 14th and 11th brigades reached their objectives from Mortroux to Julémont, Herve and Soiron. The 9th Cavalry Division, followed by the 2nd and 4th Cavalry divisions, advanced south of the Vesdre river though many obstructions, gained footholds over the Ourthe and captured the bridge at Poulseur. The 38th Brigade reached Louveigne and Theux and the 43rd Brigade reached Stoumont and La Gleize. During a night made difficult by sniping from "civilians" and bombardment by the forts, the brigades prepared to close up to the jumping-off points for the attack next day. The cavalry of Division Garnier was unable to cross the river at Lixhe until 5:00 a.m., due to artillery fire from Liège and the 34th Brigade managed to cross by 10:30 p.m., only by leaving behind the artillery and supplies.

The 27th Brigade reached its jumping-off positions from Argeteau to St. Remy and La Vaux and had mortars commence firing at the forts in the afternoon; an attack on Fort Barchon was repulsed. The 14th and 11th brigades reached their objectives with some fighting at Forêt and in the south, the 9th Cavalry Division rested its horses and held the crossings of the Ourthe and Amblève rivers. Guarding the attacking corps from cavalry reported to be between Huy and Durbuy, rather than push on to take the Meuse crossings between Liège and Huy; the southern brigades closed up to the Ourthe at Esneux, Poulseur and Fraiture. By the evening of 5 August, the coup de main was ready but it was obvious that no surprise could be obtained, given the resistance of the Belgian army "and civilians" in densely populated country, where movement had been slowed by hedges and fences. An envoy was sent to the fortress commander in Liège, who replied with "Frayez-vous le passage" ("You must fight your way through"). Emmich considered that delay would benefit the defenders and continued with the plan for a swift attack.

=== Belgian preparations ===
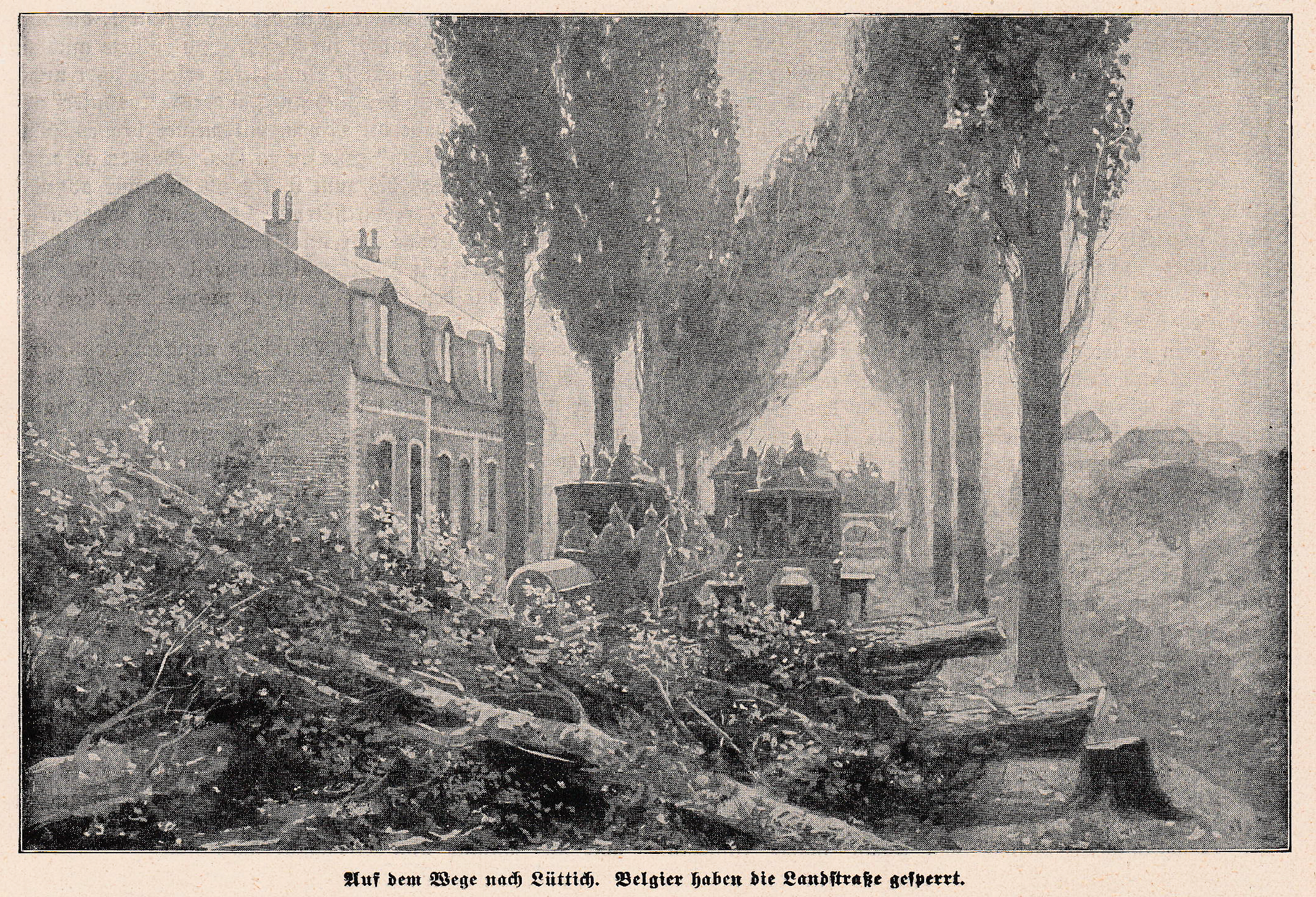
A road towards Liège blocked by Belgian troops to slow the German advance

On 30 July, the Chief of the Belgian General Staff proposed a plan to counter a violation of Belgian territory by the German army, by assembling the field army astride the Gete River between Hannut, Sint-Truiden, Tienen, Hamme and Mille. The King rejected this, as it was directed only at a German invasion and ordered a deployment further west from Perwez, Tienen, Leuven and Wavre. On 1 August, the Belgians decided to place a division each in Liège and Namur and on 3 August, the two fortresses were left to resist an invasion as best they could, while the rest of the field army protected Antwerp and waited for intervention by France and Britain, the other guarantors of Belgian neutrality. At Liège, Léman had the 3rd Division and the 15th Brigade of the 4th Division, which had arrived from Huy on the night of 5/6 August and increased the garrison to c. 30,000 men. Léman deployed the infantry against attacks from the east and south.

=== Plan of attack ===
The terrain and fortresses at Liège favoured an attack by coup de main because the gaps between the forts had not been maintained and some areas were cut by deep ravines, immune to bombardment by the fortress artillery. The General Staff assumed a Belgian garrison of 6,000 men in peacetime with c. 3,000 members of the Garde Civique. (Note: Garde Civique was a militia, active in cities with a population of more than 10,000 people, in fortified towns and those near border fortresses. All males from 21 to 50 were members "maintaining law and order and protecting the independence and territorial integrity of Belgium". The Garde was mobilised on 5 August and civilians were notified that armed resistance could only be shown by those wearing official badges.) The plan required the 34th Brigade to attack between Forts Loncin and Pontisse, the 27th Brigade to break through between the Meuse and Fort Evegnée on the east bank, the 14th Brigade to penetrate between Forts Evegnée and Fléron and the 11th Brigade between Fléron and Chaudfontaine as the 38th and 43rd brigades attacked between the Ourthe and Meuse; the II Cavalry Corps was to envelop the fortress and assemble to the north-west. The terrain made an advance across country impractical, so the attackers were to form marching columns behind vanguards, with slung rifles only to be used on officers' orders; white armbands and a password ("Der Kaiser") were to be used for recognition. The outer fortress defences were to be bypassed in the dark, so that Liège could be attacked during the day.

== Battle ==
=== 5/6 August ===
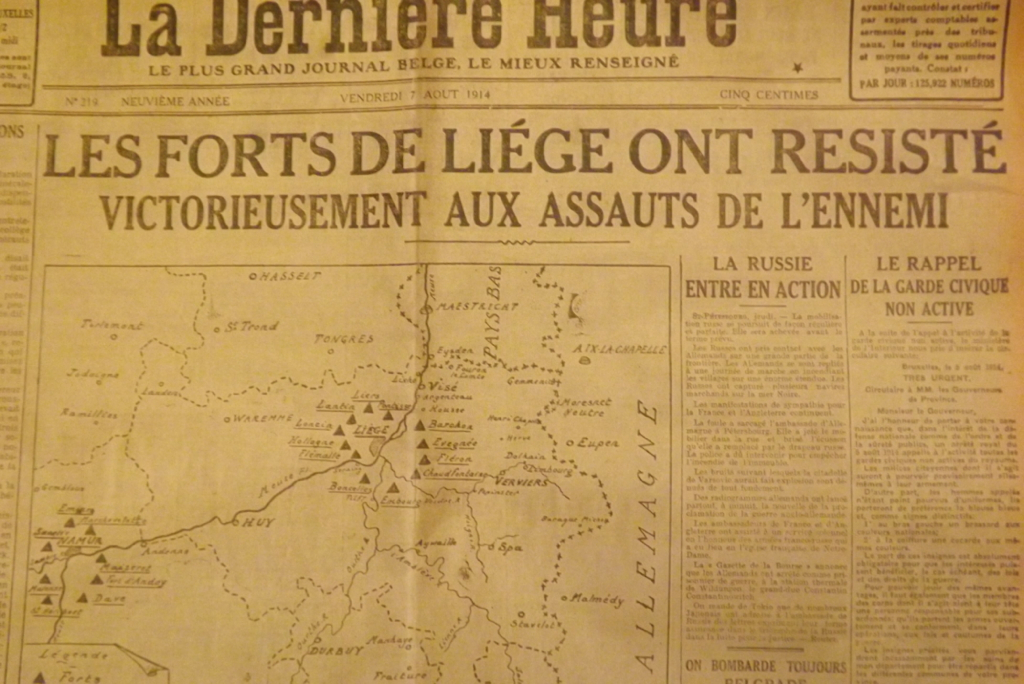
"The Liège forts resisted the enemy assaults victoriously"; Belgian newspaper La Dernière Heure Friday, 7 August 1914

In the north, the 34th Brigade (Major-General von Kraewel) had eight battalions, less their artillery, as the rest of the brigade was on the far side of the Meuse being ferried over. The attack began on 6 August at 2:30 a.m. from the village of Hermée and was bombarded with shrapnel shell by the Belgian artillery, which disorganised the infantry. A German battalion turned against Pontisse and the rest fought their way into Herstal, where a house-to-house fight against Belgian troops "and civilians" began and then took Préalle under flanking fire from forts Liers and Pontisse. (Note: Kraewel ordered the houses to be burnt down during the retreat and claimed that the entire population had participated in the fighting. Next day, the Germans killed 27 civilians in the town. From 4 to 7 August, the 34th Brigade murdered at least 117 Belgian civilians.) Troops under Major von der Oelsnitz got into Liège and nearly captured General Léman, the Military Governor before being killed or captured. By dawn the brigade was on high ground north-west of Herstal, with its units mixed up and having suffered many casualties. Belgian troops counter-attacked from Liège and the troops were bombarded by Liers and Pontisse until 10:15 a.m., when Kraewel ordered a retreat, which had to run the gauntlet between the forts and suffered many more casualties. The retreat continued all the way back to the Meuse at Lixhe, with 1,180 casualties.

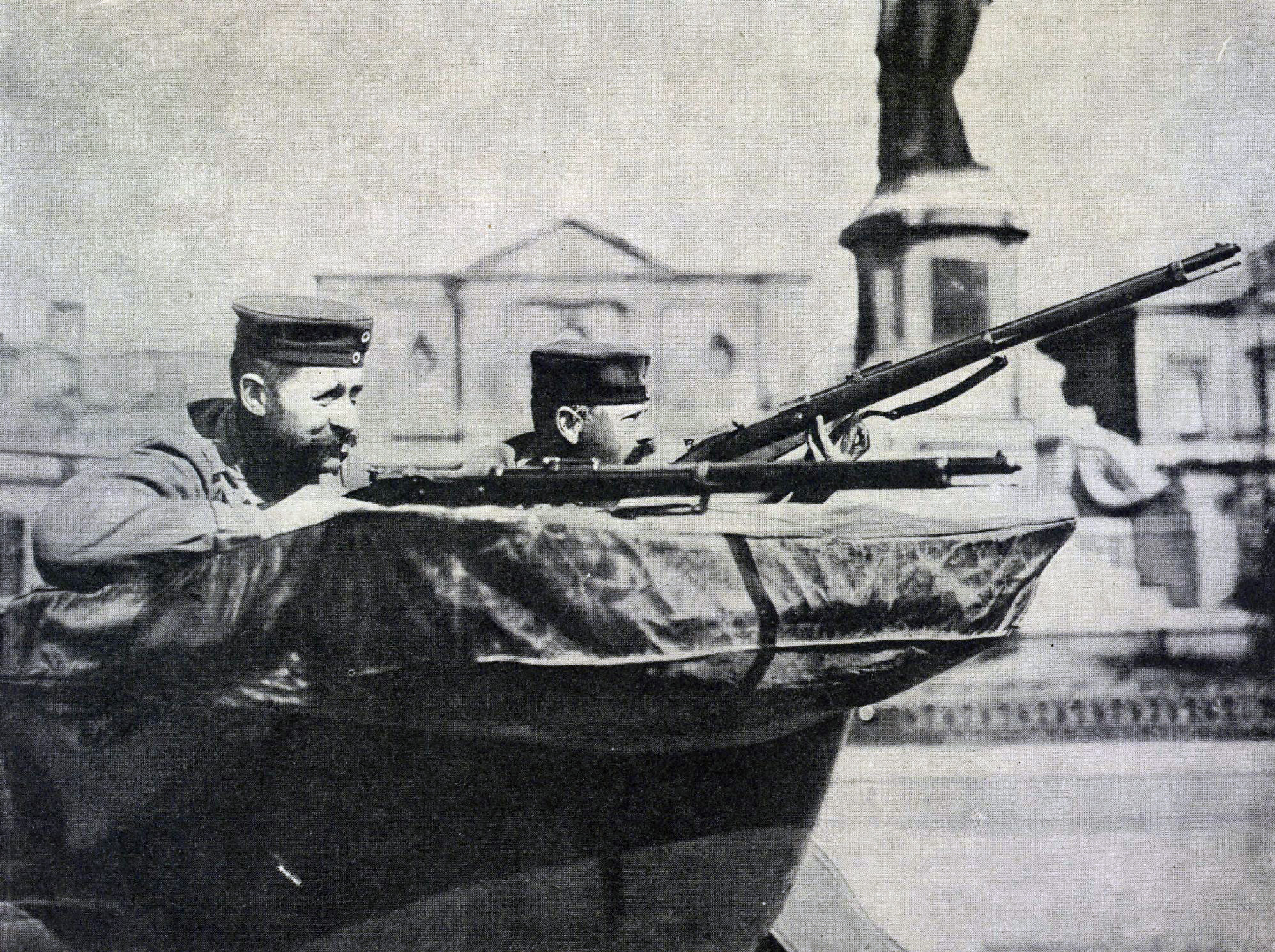
German soldiers wait for Belgian attack (Liège, 1914)

The advance of the 27th Brigade (Colonel von Massow) was hemmed in by houses, hedges and fences which made flanking moves extremely difficult. The force was bombarded by the guns of forts Wandre and Barcheron at a defensive position beyond Argenteau, where disorganisation and confusion led to the Germans firing on each other as well as the Belgians. By dawn the brigade had reached Fort Wandre but the arrival of Belgian reinforcements led Massow to order a withdrawal to Argenteau. On the left, a second column was held up at Blegny, east of Fort Barcheron and retired to Battice, when the fate of the other columns became known. To the south-east, the 11th Brigade (Major-General von Wachter) attacked through St. Hadelin and Magnée, where it was also strung out in a narrow column by buildings along the road. Small-arms fire forced the Germans between the houses and delayed the advance, which did not reach Romsée until 5:30 a.m., where the Belgian 14th Regiment had been able to prepare defences. The Belgians were defeated but only after artillery had been brought forward; the advance towards Beyne-Heusay bogged down. (Note: At St Hadelin on 6 August, the Germans killed 104 civilians, burned down Magnée and used 200 civilians from Romsée and Olne as human shields, during an attack on Forts Embourg and Chaudfontaine.) Uncertainty about the flanks led Wachter to order a retirement to ravines east of Magnée, to gain cover against the bombardment from forts Pieron and Chaudfontaine.

Liège Forts
clockwise
from N
Liers
Pontisse
Barchon
Évegnée
Fleron
Chaudfontaine
Embourg
Boncelles
Flémalle
Hollogne
Loncin
Lantin

South of the Vesdre, the 38th Brigade (Major-General von Hülsen) advance had begun on 5 August at 8:00 p.m. with the 43rd Brigade in reserve. The attackers were severely bombarded while still on the start-line and a thunderstorm, roadblocks and difficult forest paths made the advance harder. At Esneux and Poulseur, German supplies were looted "by Belgian civilians" and had to be rescued. An engagement began in woods east of Fort Boncelles; Hülsen was wounded and Belgian small-arms fire at the rear of the column, threw it into confusion. The Belgian defences were captured by the morning of 6 August but the brigades had become mingled; Boncelles village was captured but fire from the fort forced the Germans into woods to the north-west. Attacks were made later against high ground south and south-west of Ougrée. Skirmishing went on all day, with many casualties around Fort Boncelles; as ammunition ran short, the 43rd Brigade retreated to Fontin and the 38th Brigade withdrew to Lince. The attacks from the north and south had failed and a raid by Zeppelin Z-VI from Cologne, at 3:00 a.m. had little effect. The airship had been fired on by the Belgian artillery and was wrecked near Bonn, while making a forced landing due to loss of gas.

In the centre, the 14th Brigade (Major-General von Wussow) advanced at 1:00 a.m., led by Emmich and Ludendorff and made a rapid advance to Retinne, where Belgian troops covered the road with machine-guns and forced the Germans under cover with many casualties. Wussow and a regimental commander were wounded; Ludendorff took over and rallied the survivors, the Belgians were outflanked and c. 100 prisoners taken. At Queue-du-Bois, the advance was stopped during house-to-house fighting, until two howitzers were brought up and the village was captured around dawn. By noon, the brigade had reached high ground near a Carthusian convent and saw a white flag flying on the Citadel over the river. An officer was sent forward to investigate and found that the flag was unauthorised and was repudiated by Léman. Attempts were made to contact flanking units but communications to the rear had been cut and no ammunition had been delivered, which left the force of c. 1,500 men isolated during the night.

During the morning of 7 August, Emmich made "a desperate and bold decision" that the bridges in Liège were undefended and ordered the town to be occupied. Infantry Regiment 165 (Oberst von Oven) crossed the river over the bridge and reached the north-western gate without resistance, taking several parties of Belgian infantry prisoner. Ludendorff, motoring ahead of Infantry Regiment 27 under the impression that the Citadel had been captured, found that he was alone with the garrison and bluffed them into surrender. The town and the Meuse bridges had been captured with most of the railway lines intact. Emmich sent officers to make contact with the other brigades and the 11th Brigade began an advance into Liège at noon, through artillery fire from Fort Chaudfontaine, was in the town by evening and formed a defensive line along the west side. The 27th, 24th and the rest of the 11th Brigade entered the town and operations began to capture the forts.

=== 5–7 August ===
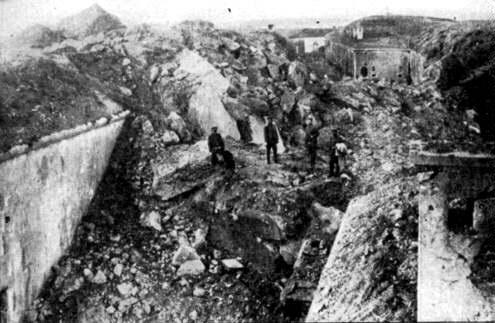
Fort Loncin shortly after the battle

On the morning of 5 August, Captain Brinckman, the German Military Attaché at Brussels, met the Governor of Liège under a flag of truce and demanded the surrender of the fortress. Léman refused ("Frayez-vous le passage" [Fight your way through]) and an hour later, German troops attacked the east bank forts of Chaudfontaine, Fléron, Évegnée, Barchon and Pontisse; an attack on the Meuse, below the junction with the Vesdre, failed. A party of German troops managed to get between Fort de Barchon and the river Meuse, then was forced to retreat by the Belgian 11th Brigade. From the late afternoon into the night, the German infantry attacked in five columns, two from the north, one from the east and two from the south. The attacks were supported by heavy artillery but the German infantry were repulsed with great loss.

The attack at the Ourthe forced back the defenders between the forts, before counter-attacks by the 12th, 9th and 15th Brigades checked the German advance. Just before dawn, a small German raiding party tried to abduct the Governor from the Belgian headquarters in Rue Ste Foi. Alarmed by gunfire in the street, Léman and his staff rushed outside and joined the guard platoon fighting the raiding party, which was driven off with twenty dead and wounded left behind. German cavalry moved south from Visé to encircle the town; German cavalry patrols had been operating up to 20 km (12 mi) west of Liege, leading Léman to believe that the German II Cavalry Corps was encircling the fortified area from the north, though in fact the main body of that force was still to the east and did not cross the Meuse until 8 August, when the reservists had arrived. Believing he would be trapped, Léman decided that the 3rd Infantry Division and 15th Infantry Brigade should withdraw westwards to the Gete, to join the Belgian field army.

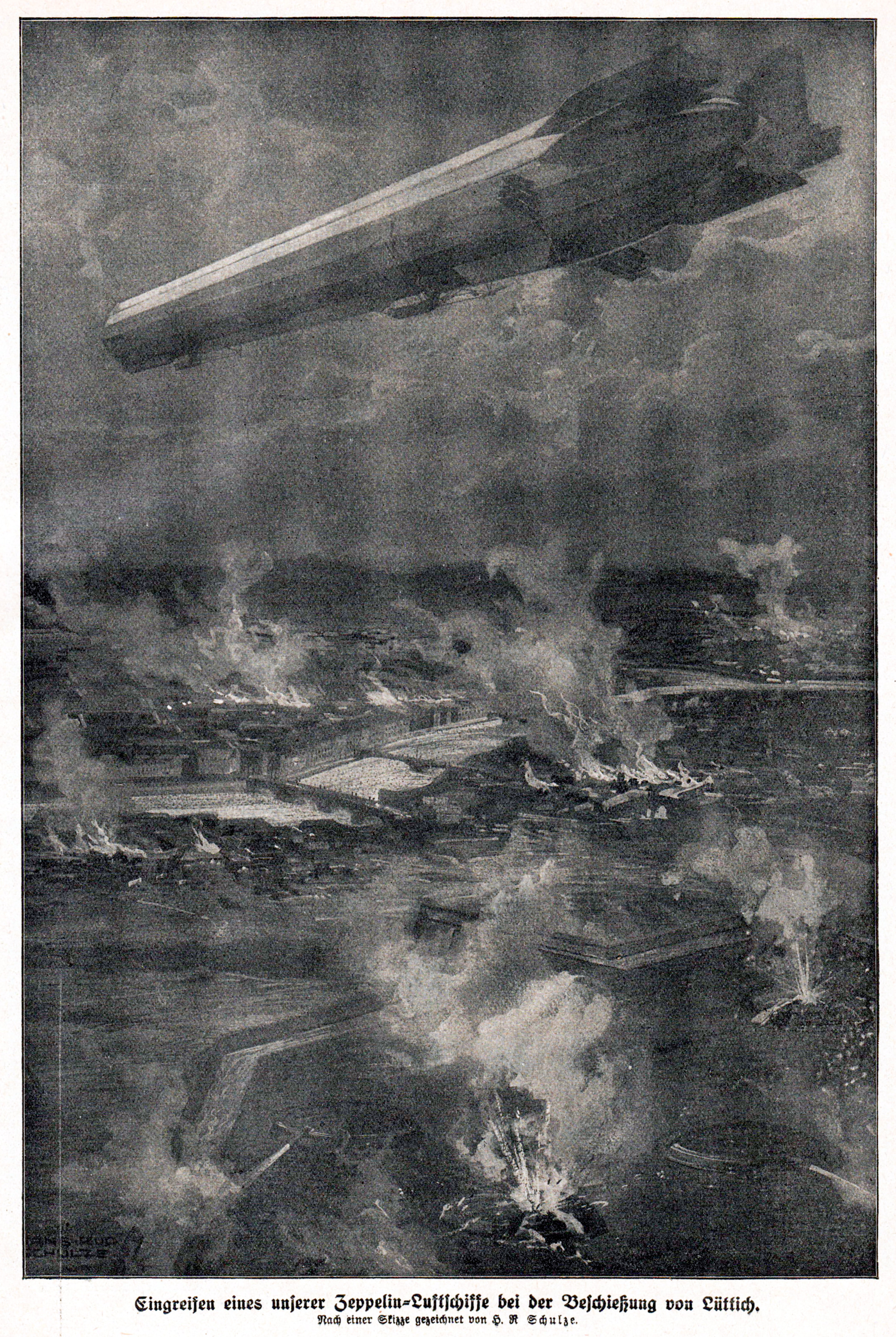
Depiction of a German Zeppelin airship bombing Liège

On 6 August, the Germans carried out the first air attack on a European city, when a Zeppelin airship bombed Liège and killed nine civilians. Léman believed that units from five German corps confronted the defenders and assembled the 3rd Division between forts Loncin and Hollogne to begin the withdrawal to the Gete during the afternoon and night of 6/7 August. The fortress troops were concentrated in the forts, rather than the perimeter and at noon, Léman set up a new headquarters in Fort Loncin, on the western side of the city. German artillery bombarded the forts and Fort Fléron was put out of action when its cupola-hoisting mechanism was destroyed by the bombardment. On the night of 6/7 August German infantry were able to advance between the forts and during the early morning of 7 August, Ludendorff took command of the attack, ordered up a field howitzer and fought through Queue-du-Bois to the high ground overlooking Liège and captured the Citadel of Liège. Ludendorff sent a party forward to Léman under a flag of truce to demand surrender but Léman refused.

== Siege ==
=== 8–16 August ===
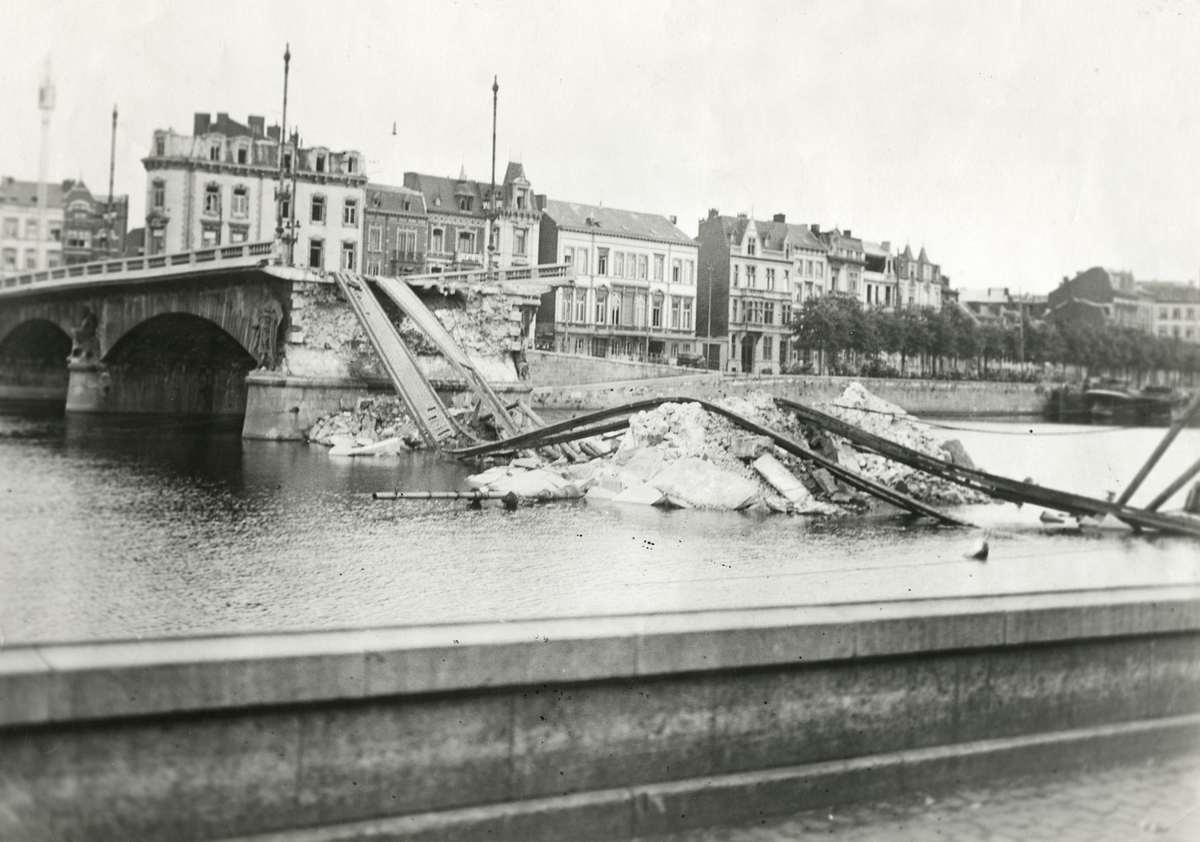
The destroyed Pont des Arches in the centre of Liège, demolished by Belgian troops on 6 August.

Bülow gave command of the siege operations at Liège to the VII Corps commander (General Karl von Einem) with the IX and X Corps under his command. The three corps had been ordered to advance over the Belgian border on 8 August. At Liège, on 7 August, Emmich sent liaison officers to make contact with the brigades scattered around the town. The 11th Brigade advanced into the town and joined the troops there on the western fringe. The 27th Brigade arrived by 8 August, along with the rest of the 11th and 14th brigades. Fort Barcheron fell after a bombardment by mortars and the 34th Brigade took over the defence of the bridge over the Meuse at Lixhe. On the southern front, the 38th and 43rd Brigades retreated towards Theux after a false report that Belgian troops were attacking from Liège and Namur. On the night of 10/11 August Einem ordered that Liège be isolated on the eastern and south-eastern fronts by the IX, VII and X corps as they arrived and allotted the capture of Forts Liers, Pontisse, Evegnée and Fléron to IX Corps and Chaudfontaine and Embourg to VII Corps as X Corps guarded the southern flank.

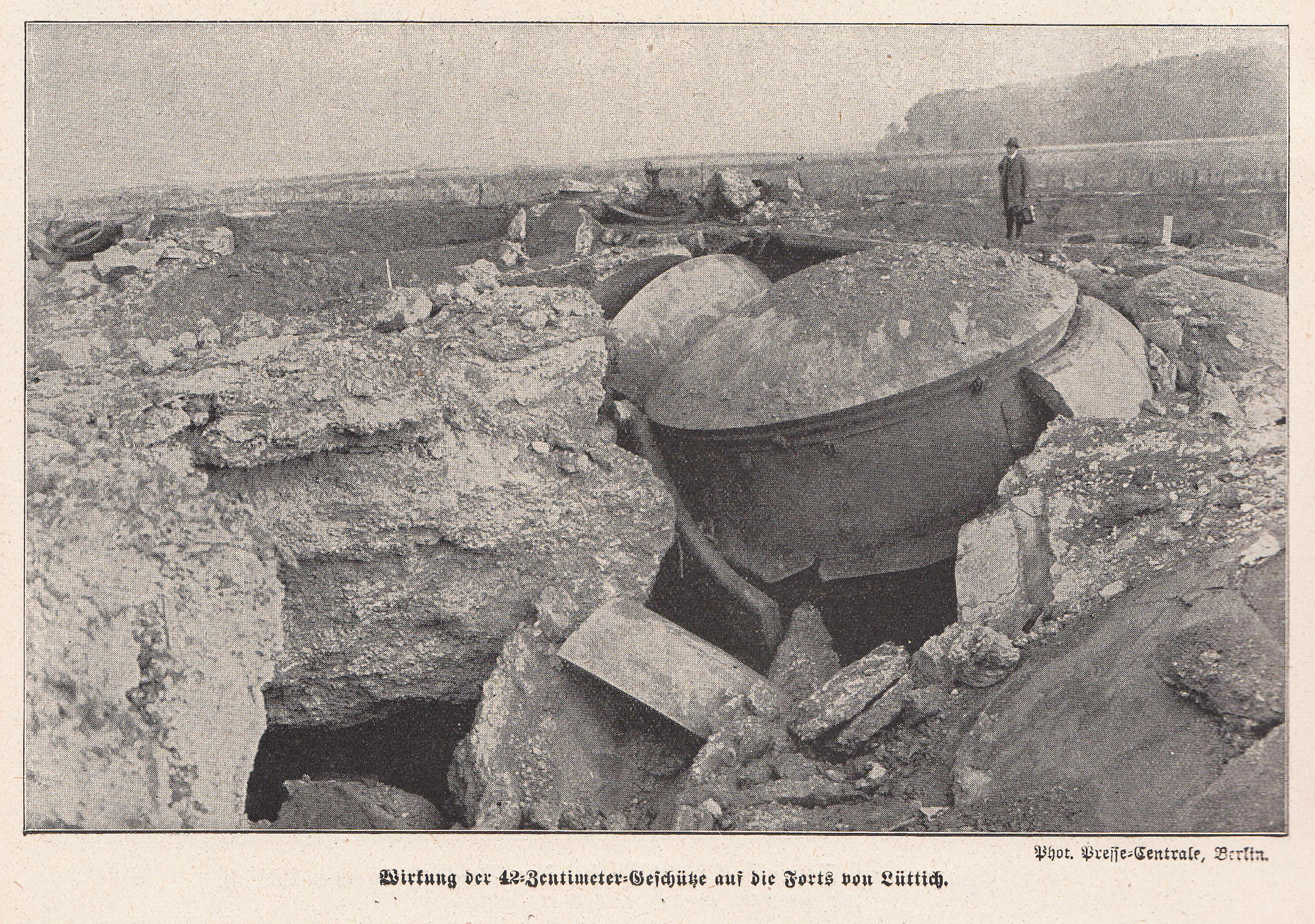
Destruction at the Fort de Loncin after the German bombardment

Before the orders arrived, Fort Evegnée was captured after a bombardment. IX Corps isolated Fort Pontisse on 12 August and began a bombardment of Forts Pontisse and Fléron during the afternoon, with 380 mm (15 in) coastal mortars and Big Bertha 420 mm (17 in) siege howitzers. The VII Corps heavy artillery began to fire on Fort Chaudfontaine, Fort Pontisse was surrendered and IX Corps crossed the Meuse to attack Fort Liers. Fort Liers fell in the morning of 14 August and the garrison of Fort Fléron surrendered in the afternoon, after a Minenwerfer bombardment. The X Corps and the 17th Division were moved to the north and VII Corps to the south of the Liège–Brussels railway and on 15 August, a bombardment began on the forts to the west of the town. Fort Boncelles fell in the morning and Fort Lantin in the afternoon and Fort Loncin was obliterated in a magazine explosion; Léman was captured. Forts Hollogne and Flémalle were surrendered on the morning of 16 August after a short bombardment.

== Aftermath ==
=== Analysis ===
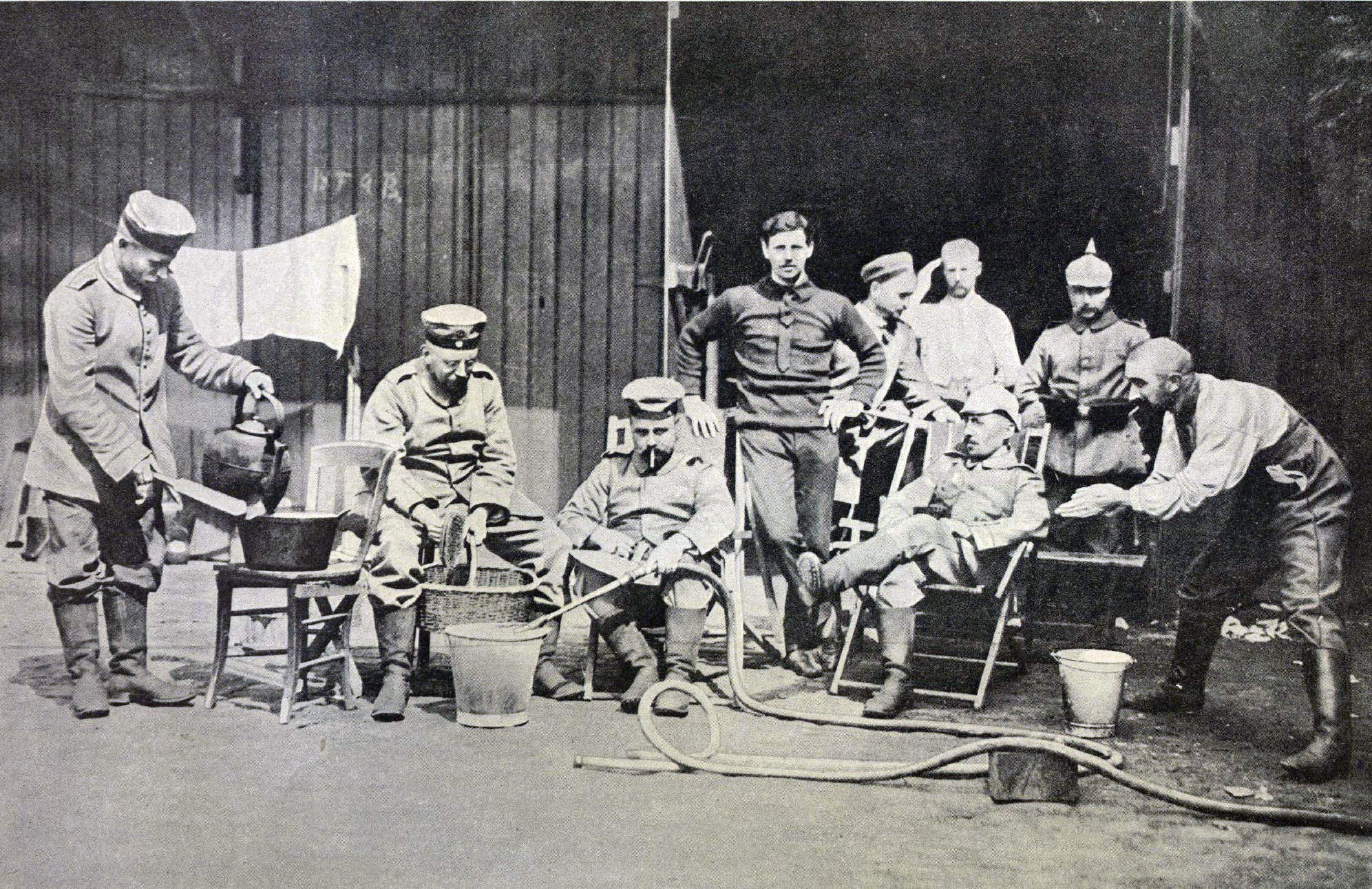
German soldiers make beer (Liège, 1914)

By the morning of 17 August, the German 1st Army, 2nd Army and 3rd Army were free to resume their advance to the French frontier. The Belgian field army withdrew from the Gete towards Antwerp from 18 to 20 August and Brussels was captured unopposed on 20 August. The siege of Liège had lasted for eleven days, rather than the two days anticipated by the Germans. For 18 days, Belgian resistance in the east of the country had delayed German operations, which gave an advantage to the Franco-British forces in northern France and in Belgium. In Graf Schlieffen und der Weltkrieg (1921) Wolfgang Förster wrote that the German timetable of deployment had required its armies to reach a line from Thionville to Sedan and Mons by the 22nd day of mobilisation (23 August), which was achieved ahead of schedule. In Bulletin Belge des Sciences Militaires (September 1921), a four-day delay was claimed. John Buchan wrote

The triumph was moral – an advertisement to the world that the ancient faiths of country and duty could still nerve the arm for battle and that the German idol, for all its splendour, had feet of clay.

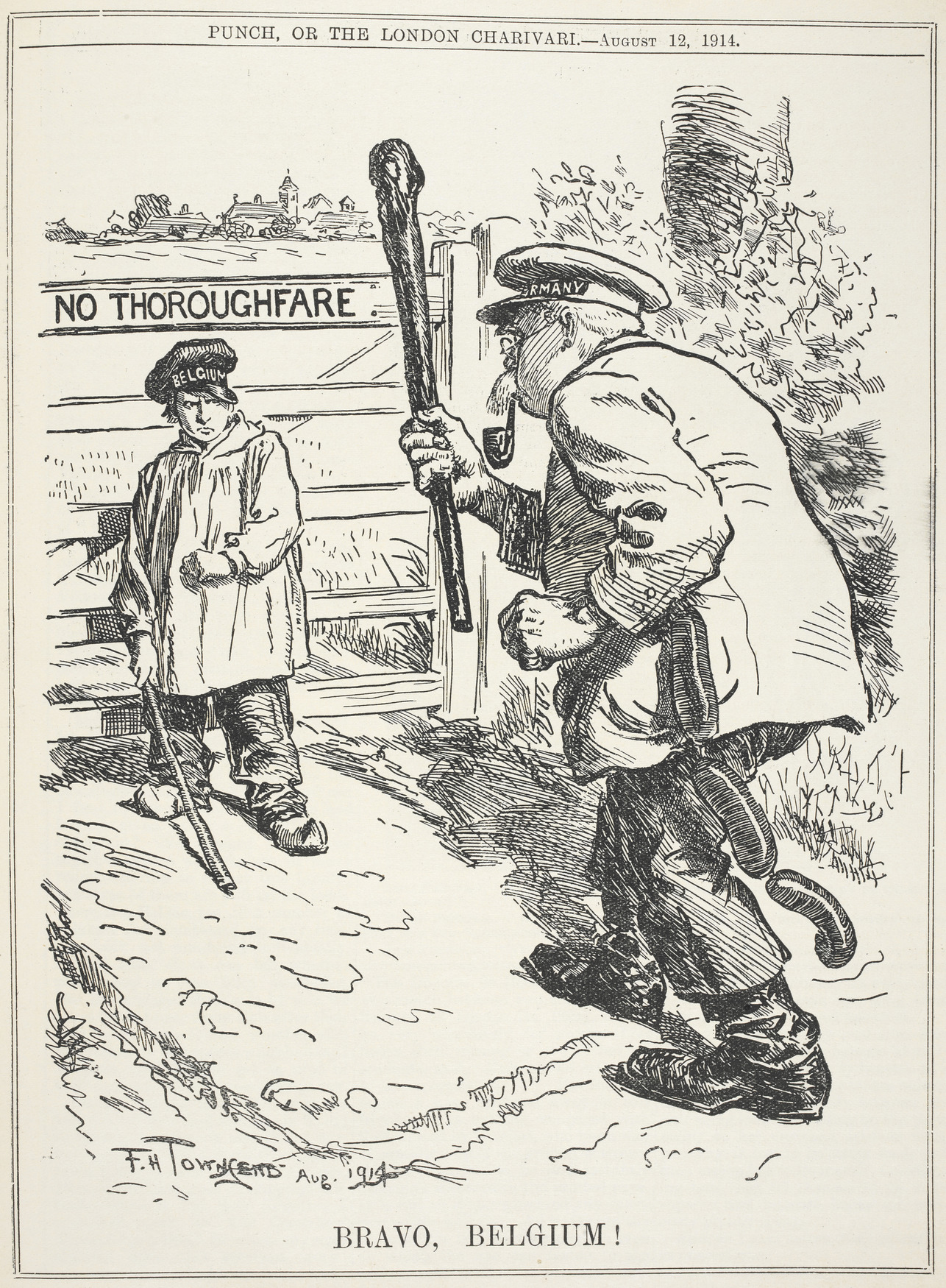
Punch cartoon celebrating the Belgian defence.

In the first volume of Der Weltkrieg (1925), the German official historians wrote that the Battle of Liège had ended just in time for the German armies to begin their march up the Meuse valley. The Aix-la-Chapelle–Liège railway line was operational by 15 August, although repairs had been necessary at the Nasproue tunnel and the line at Verviers, where 17 locomotives had been crashed together. The efforts of the 14th Brigade, Emmich and Ludendorff were commended and the value of the super-heavy artillery was noted. In 1926 James Edmonds, the British official historian, recorded that General Alexander von Kluck had considered that a delay of 4 to 5 days had been caused by the resistance of the Liège garrisons. The most advanced corps of the 1st Army reached a line from Kermt to Stevoort and Gorsem, 40 mi (64 km) west of Aachen (Aix La Chapelle), from 7 to 17 August and the resistance of the Liège garrisons may have stopped the Germans from reaching the area by 10 August. General Karl von Bülow, commander of the 2nd Army, wrote that Liège had been besieged by six composite brigades and a cavalry corps and on 10 August, OHL had hoped to begin the advance to the French border three days later but that the siege delayed the march until 17 August.

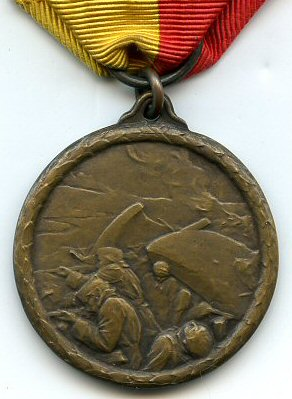
The Liège Medal, awarded to the Belgian defenders of the city in 1920

In 1934, the British historian Charles Cruttwell, wrote of "brave Belgian resistance" at Liège, which surprised the Germans but did not interfere with their plans and that demolitions of railway tunnels and bridges were a more serious cause of delay. Sewell Tyng wrote in 1935 that the southward advance of the German armies had begun on 14 August, after all of the forts on the right bank had fallen. The eleven-day siege had been a "bitter disappointment" to the German commanders; there had been failures of co-ordination, which had led to several incidents of German infantry firing on each other. Liaison between the infantry and their commanders was inadequate; attacking before the super-heavy artillery was ready had caused a disproportionate number of casualties. Tyng wrote that the delay imposed on the Germans was about 48 hours, although various authorities had claimed anything from no delay to five days. In 2001, Hew Strachan wrote that the German advance had been delayed by 48 hours because the concentration of German active corps had taken until 13 August. Liège was awarded the French Légion d'honneur in 1914. The effect of German and Austrian super-heavy artillery on French and Belgian fortresses in 1914 led to a loss of confidence in fortifications; much of the artillery of fortress complexes in France and Russia was removed to reinforce field armies. At the Battle of Verdun in 1916, the resilience of French forts proved to have been underestimated.

=== Casualties ===
In 2009 Herwig wrote that the Belgian army had 20,000 casualties at Liège and that by 8 August the German attackers had suffered 5,300 casualties. Other sources give 2,000–3,000 Belgian killed or wounded and 4,000 prisoners.

=== Subsequent operations ===
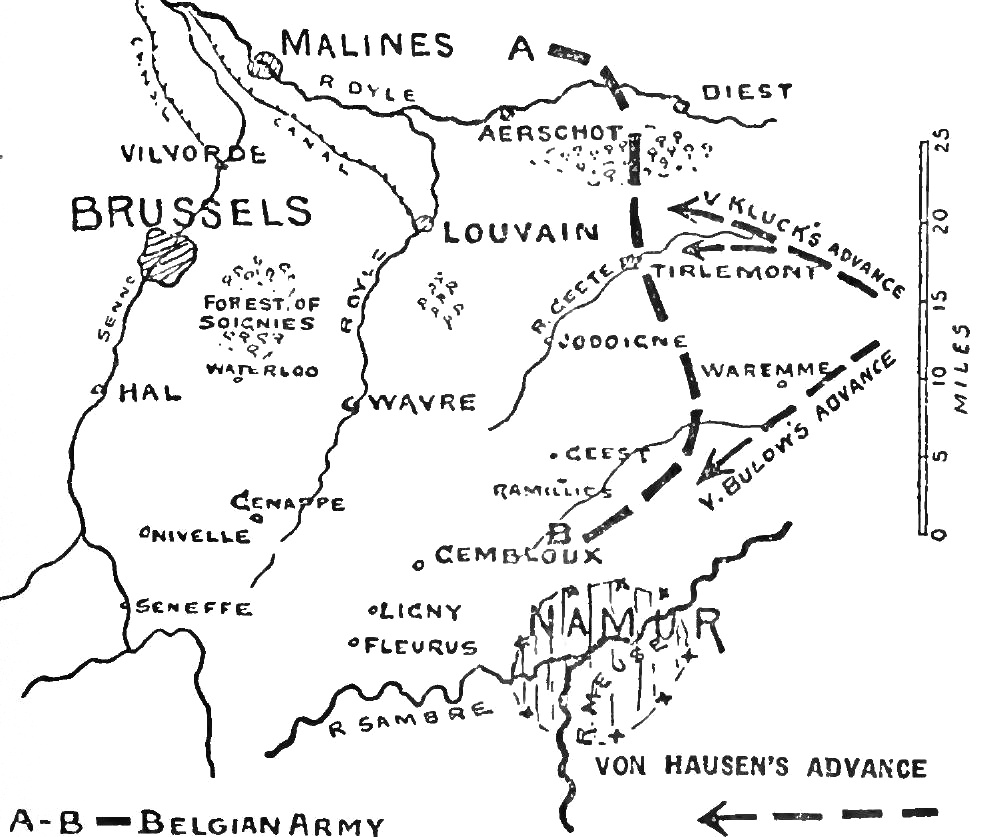
German moves after the fall of Liège, 1914

On 5 August the 4th Division at Namur, received notice from Belgian cavalry that they were in contact with German cavalry to the north of the fortress. More German troops appeared to the south-west on 7 August. OHL had, on the same day, ordered the 2nd Army units assembled near the Belgian border, to advance and send mixed brigades from the IX, VII and X corps to Liège immediately. Large numbers of German troops did not arrive in the vicinity of Namur until 19–20 August, too late to forestall the arrival of the 8th Brigade, which having been isolated at Huy, had blown the bridge over the Meuse on 19 August and retired to Namur. During the day the Guards Reserve Corps of the German 2nd Army arrived to the north of the fortress zone and the XI Corps of the 3rd Army, with the 22nd Division and the 38th Division, arrived to the south-east.

A siege train, including one Krupp 420 mm and four Austrian 305 mm howitzers accompanied the German troops and on 20 August, Belgian outposts were driven in. Next day, the German super-heavy guns began to bombard the eastern and south-eastern forts. The Belgian defenders had no means of keeping the German siege guns out of range or engaging them with counter-battery fire. By evening two forts had been seriously damaged and after another 24 hours the forts were mostly destroyed. Two Belgian counter-attacks on 22 August were defeated and by the end of 23 August, the northern and eastern fronts were defenceless, with five of the nine forts in ruins. The Namur garrison withdrew at midnight to the south-west and eventually managed to rejoin the Belgian field army at Antwerp; the last fort was surrendered on 25 August.

== See also ==
- Liège Medal
- Siege of Przemyśl (September 1914–March 1915)
