= Otto von Emmich =

Prussian general (1848–1915)

- Born: 4 August 1848; Minden, Kingdom of Prussia
- Died: 22 December 1915 (aged 67); Hanover, Kingdom of Prussia, German Empire
- Military career
- Allegiance: Kingdom of Prussia; North German Confederation; German Empire
- Branch: Prussian Army; Imperial German Army
- Service years: 1866–1915
- Rank: General der Infanterie (General of the Infantry)
- Commands: X Army Corps; Army of the Meuse
- Conflicts: Franco-Prussian War; World War I
- Awards: Pour le Mérite with Oakleaves

Albert Theodor Otto Emmich (from 1912, von Emmich) (4 August 1848 – 22 December 1915) was a Prussian general who fought in the Franco-Prussian War and was a senior commander in World War I. He was the first recipient of the Pour le Mérite, Prussia's highest military honor, in World War I for his role in the Battle of Liège.

== Family ==
Albert Theodor Otto Emmich was born on 4 August 1848 in Minden in the Kingdom of Prussia as the son of Oberst (Colonel) Adolf Julius Theodor Emmich (1805–1871) and Auguste Therese Adel, née Hagspihl (1825–1979). On 20 April 1880, he married Elise Pauline Sophie, née von Graberg (1855–1920), daughter of Generalmajor Karl von Graberg. The couple had one daughter (1881–1949). Emmich was ennobled as "von Emmich" on 27 January 1912 by Kaiser Wilhelm II.

== Military career ==
Emmich entered the Prussian Army on 3 July 1866 as an Avantageur (officer candidate) and three-year volunteer in the 6. Westfälisches Infanterie-Regiment Nr. 55 in Detmold and was commissioned a Secondelieutenant in the regiment on 8 February 1868. He served in the Franco-Prussian War as adjutant of the regiment's 1st Battalion, seeing action in the battles of Spicheren, Colombey-Nouilly, Gravelotte-St. Privat and in the siege of Metz, and was decorated with the Iron Cross 2nd Class and the Schaumburg-Lippe Military Merit Medal with Swords. On 12 December 1874, he was promoted to Premierlieutenant with a patent of 14 December 1871.

From 29 April 1875 to 15 October 1879, Emmich served as Adjutant of the 29th Infantry Brigade in Cologne. In the meantime, he was transferred to the 6. Brandenburgisches Infanterie-Regiment Nr. 52 in Cottbus on 15 June 1875 and then placed à la suite of the 7. Rheinisches Infanterie-Regiment Nr. 69. On 16 October 1879, he joined the regiment in Trier and on 13 January 1880 he was promoted to Hauptmann and named a company commander.

On 22 March 1881, Emmich was transferred to the newly-formed 2. Lothringisches Infanterie-Regiment Nr. 131 in Mörchingen (Morhange) in Alsace-Lorraine. On 16 May 1888, he was transferred to the Flensburg-based Schleswig-Holsteinisches Infanterie-Regiment Nr. 86 (renamed Füsilier-Regiment Königin (Schleswig-Holsteinisches) Nr. 86 on 9 September 1890) with a backdated patent of 13 February 1879. He was given the Charakter of Major on 22 May 1889 and a patent as major on 16 August 1889.

On 18 November 1890, Emmich was named a battalion commander in the 2. Großherzoglich Hessisches Infanterie-Regiment (Großherzog) Nr. 116 (renamed Infanterie-Regiment Kaiser Wilhelm (2. Großherzoglich Hessisches) Nr. 116 on 5 November 1891) in Gießen. On 17 February 1894, he was named commander of Kurhessisches Jäger-Bataillon Nr. 11 in Marburg. He was promoted to Oberstleutnant on 13 May 1895.

On 17 June 1897, Emmich was promoted to Oberst and named commander of the 6. Badisches Infanterie-Regiment Kaiser Friedrich III. Nr. 114 in Konstanz in Baden. With his promotion to Generalmajor on 18 May 1901, he was named commander of the 31st Infantry Brigade in Trier. He was promoted to Generalleutnant on 14 February 1905 and assumed command of the 10th Division in Posen on 22 April 1905.

On 29 May 1909, Emmich was promoted to General der Infanterie and named commanding general of the X Army Corps in Hannover. On 16 June 1913, he was placed à la suite of the Füsilier-Regiment Generalfeldmarschall Prinz Albrecht von Preußen (Hannoversches) Nr. 73.

== World War I ==
Emmich remained the commanding general of the X Army Corps when World War I began in August 1914. For the task of taking the forts of Liège and securing the invasion roads into Belgium, Emmich was given command of a task force known as the Army of the Meuse (Maasarmee), consisting of 6 infantry brigades (11th, 14th, 27th, 34th, 38th and 43rd), the separate Infanterie-Regiment Nr. 25, and the Higher Cavalry Command 2 with the 2nd 4th and 9th Cavalry Divisions, along with heavy artillery and engineers.

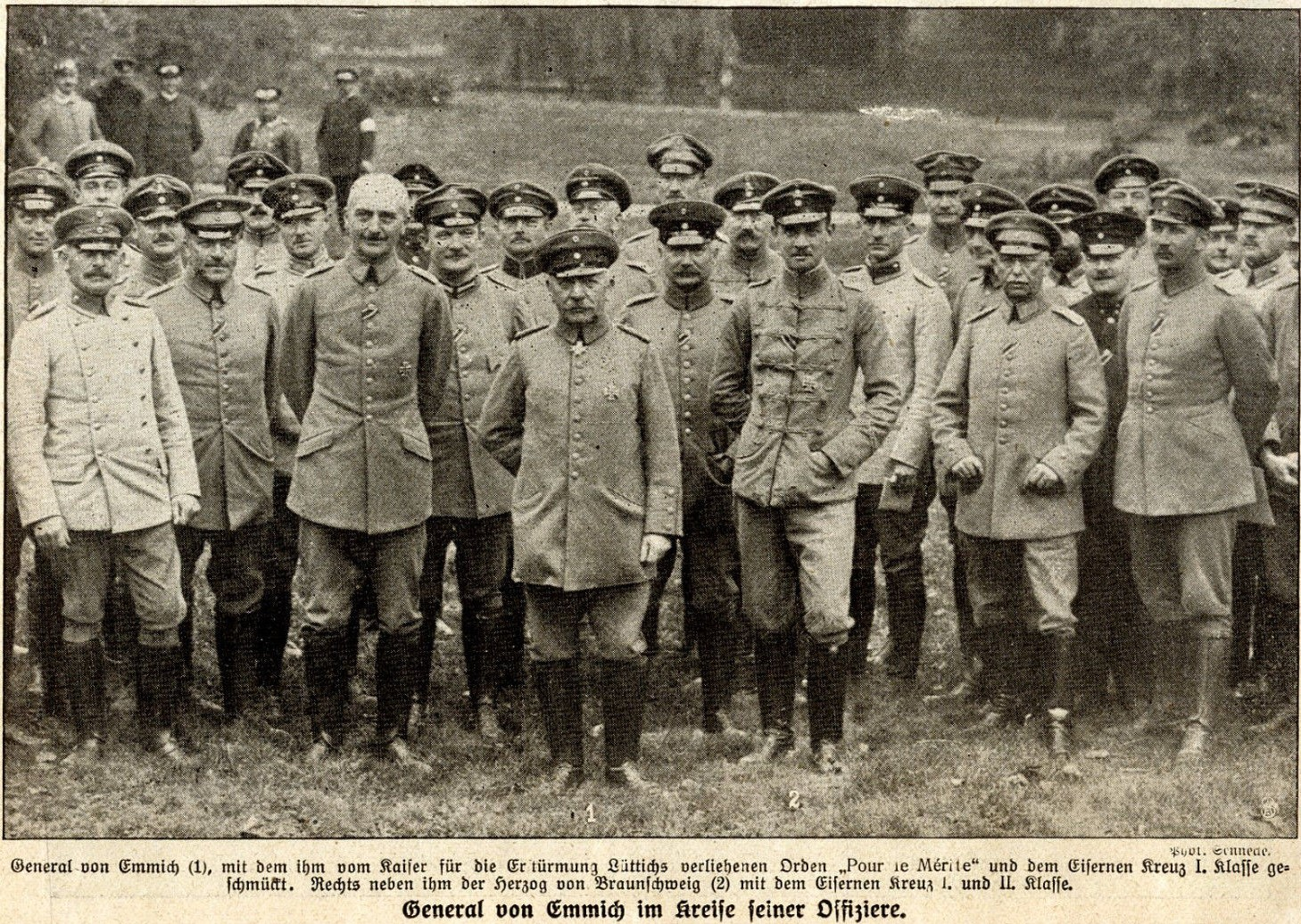
Emmich and his staff after the award of the Pour le Mérite for the Battle of Liège.

The Battle of Liège began shortly after the morning of 5 August 1914, when German bombardment began on the eastern Belgian forts, making it chronologically the first battle to take place during World War I, beginning shortly before the Battle of Mulhouse. Due to the tenacity of the Belgian defenders, the German troops were obliged to entrench and bring up heavy siege artillery. Emmich's forces laid siege to Liège, which he entered on 7 August 1914, but the last forts did not surrender until 16 August 1914. On 7 August 1914, for Emmich's "courageous leadership in the capture of the Belgian fortress Liege," the Kaiser presented him with the first award of the Order Pour le Mérite in World War I.

With the successful seizure of the Liege fortifications, the Meuse Army was disbanded and Emmich resumed command of the X Army Corps. He led the corps in the Battle of the Sambre on 23/24 August 1914 and the Battle of St. Quentin on 29/30 August 1914. The corps was halted on the Petit Morin during the First Battle of the Marne. Arriving in the vicinity of Reims, the corps transitioned to trench warfare, remaining there until late April 1915.

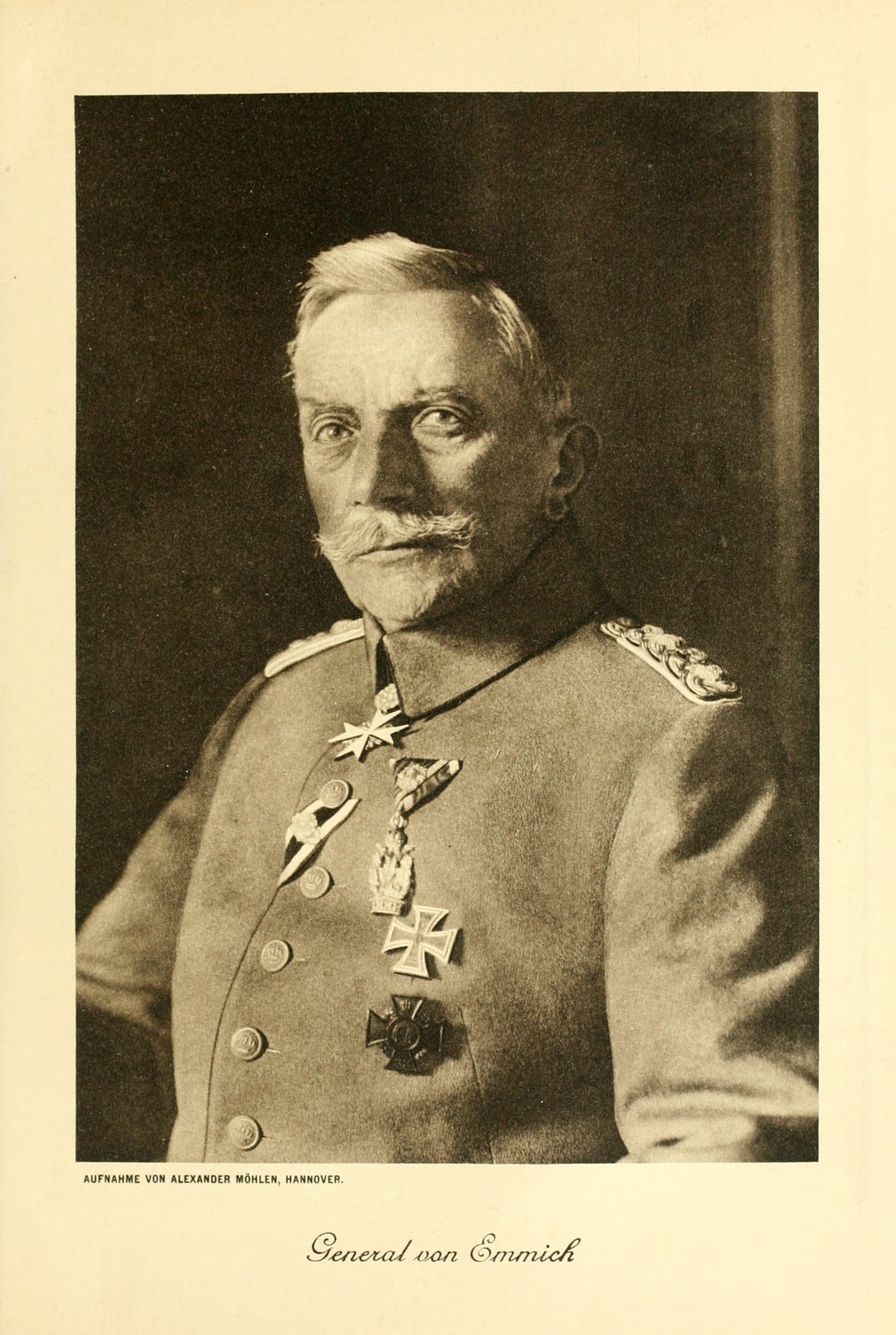
Emmich after the award of the Oakleaves to the Pour le Mérite and the Austro-Hungarian Order of the Iron Crown.

The corps was then transferred to the Eastern Front and assigned to the 11th Army under August von Mackensen for the Gorlice–Tarnów Offensive. The X Army Corps was initially the 11th Army's reserve, but on the second day of the offensive, Emmich led a reinforced corps, consisting of the 11th Bavarian Infantry Division, the 20th Infantry Division and the 119th Infantry Division, into battle against the Russians. The Russians were forced back, and Emmich's corps advanced, crossing the San in mid-May. On 14 May 1915, the Kaiser awarded Emmich the Oakleaves to the Pour le Mérite.

In June, Emmich's corps captured Lubaczów. They pursued the Russian Eighth Army as it retreated towards Lemberg near Gródek. In July, Mackensen's forces moved north, forcing the Russian Army into what became known as the Great Retreat.

Emmich's corps took Krasnystaw and Biskupice, crossed the Bug, and advanced to the north and east, fighting along the Jasiolda river between Brest-Litovsk and Pinsk.

The corps halted offensive operations in mid-September and was transported back to the Western Front. Emmich took ill, however, and was forced to pass command of his corps to Walther Freiherr von Lüttwitz. Emmich died three months later, on 22 December 1915.

== Decorations and awards ==
- Kingdom of Prussia:
  - Order Pour le Mérite (7 August 1914) with Oakleaves (14 May 1915)
  - Order of the Red Eagle
    - Grand Cross with Oakleaves
    - 2nd Class with Star, Oakleaves and the Royal Crown
  - Order of the Crown, 1st Class
  - Iron Cross 2nd Class (1870) with 25th anniversary oakleaves
  - Iron Cross 1st Class (1914)
  - Officer's Service Decoration Cross for 25 years' service
  - War Commemorative Medal of 1870–1871
  - Kaiser Wilhelm Memorial Medal (Centenary Medal) (22 March 1897)
- Grand Duchy of Baden: Order of the Zähringer Lion, Commander's Cross 2nd Class
- Duchy of Brunswick: Order of Henry the Lion, Grand Cross
- (Principality of Schaumburg-Lippe) Lippe Principalities: House Order of the Cross of Honor, 3rd Class
- Grand Duchy of Oldenburg:
  - House and Merit Order of Peter Frederick Louis, Grand Cross
  - Friedrich August Cross, 1st and 2nd Class
- Principality of Schaumburg-Lippe: Military Merit Medal with Swords (1870)
- Kingdom of Belgium: Order of Leopold, Grand Cross
- Austria-Hungary: Order of the Iron Crown, 1st Class with War Decoration (1915)
