= Fort de Fléron =

19th-20th century defence for Liège, Belgium

- Part of Fortified Position of Liège
- Fléron, Belgium
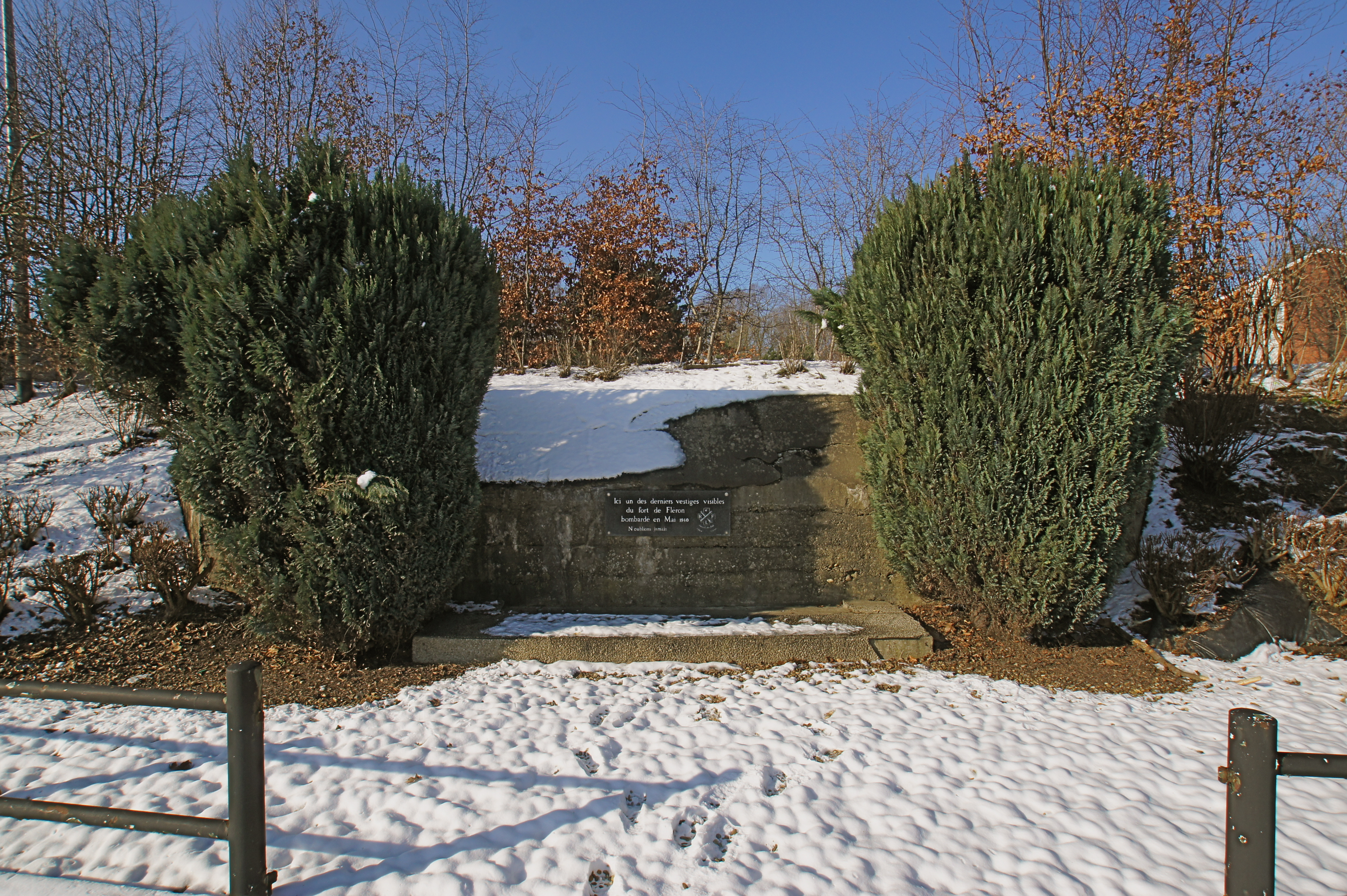
- Memorial and wall at Fléron

Site information
- Type: Fort
- Controlled by: Belgium
- Condition: Buried

Location
- Location within Belgium
- Coordinates: 50.61763°N 5.6922°E

Site history
- Built: 1881
- Materials: Unreinforced concrete
- Battles/wars: Battle of Liège, Battle of Belgium

The Fort de Fléron (French pronunciation: [fɔʁ də fleʁɔ̃]) is one of twelve forts built around Liège, Belgium, in the late 19th century. The overall Fortified Position of Liège was a constituent part of the country's National Redoubt. Fort de Fléron was built between 1881 and 1891 according to the plans of General Henri Alexis Brialmont. Contrasting with the French forts built in the same era by Raymond Adolphe Séré de Rivières, the fort was built exclusively of unreinforced concrete, a new material, rather than masonry. The fort was heavily bombarded by German artillery in the Battle of Liège. Fléron was upgraded in the 1930s in an attempt to forestall or slow an attack from Germany. Located in the center of Fléron, the fort has been buried and is surrounded by apartments.

== Description ==
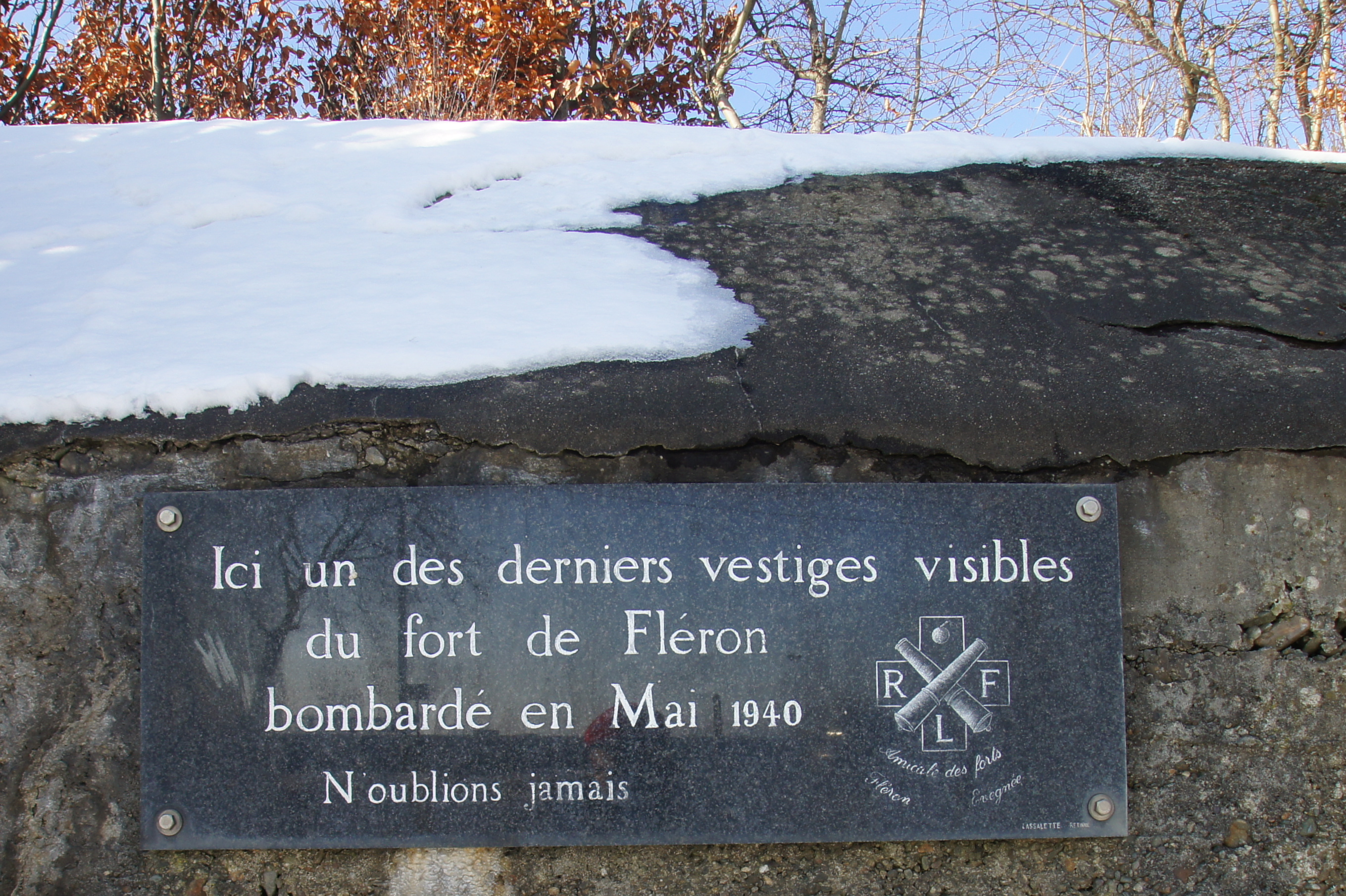
Plaque noting "one of the last visible remnants" of the fort

The Fort de Fléron is located about 7 kilometres (4.3 mi) southeast of the center of Liège, in the center of Fléron. The fort formed an isosceles triangle whose base is 300 metres (980 ft) long and whose sides measured 235 metres (771 ft). A 6-metre (20 ft) deep by 8-metre (26 ft) ditch encircled the fort. The principal armament was concentrated in the central massif. The ditches were defended in enfilade by 57 mm guns in casemates resembling counterscarp batteries, firing at shot traps at the other end of the ditch. One of the larger forts of Liège, it was armed with heavy artillery in rotating turrets, concentrated in a central massif. The compact center was surrounded by four turrets with lighter guns for close defense.

With the exception of the Fort de Loncin, the Belgian forts made little provision for the daily needs of their wartime garrisons, locating latrines, showers, kitchens and the morgue in the fort's counterscarp, a location that would be untenable in combat. This would have profound effects on the forts' ability to endure a long assault. The service areas were placed directly opposite the barracks, which opened into the ditch in the rear of the fort (i.e., in the face towards Liège), with lesser protection than the two "salient" sides. The Brialmont forts placed a weaker side to the rear to allow for recapture by Belgian forces from the rear, and located the barracks and support facilities on this side, using the rear ditch for light and ventilation of living spaces. In combat heavy shellfire made the rear ditch untenable, and German forces were able to get between the forts and attack them from the rear.

The Brialmont forts were designed to be protected from shellfire equaling their heaviest guns: 21 cm. The top of the central massif used 4 metres (13 ft) of unreinforced concrete, while the caserne walls, judged to be less exposed, used 1.5 metres (4.9 ft). Under fire, the forts were damaged by 21 cm fire and could not withstand heavier artillery.

== Armament ==
Fléron's armament included 21 cm, 15 cm and 12 cm gun turrets for distant targets and 57 mm gun turrets for local defense. It also mounted an observation turret with a searchlight. Rapid-fire 57 mm guns were provided in casemates for the defense of the ditches and the postern.

The large weapons were all German products, made by Krupp in Essen, but the armor was by Cockerill (Belgium), Ateliers de Creusot (France) or Gruson (Germany). The fort was provided with signal lights to permit communication with the neighboring Fort de Loncin and Fort de Liers. The guns were fired using black powder rather than smokeless powder, producing choking gas in the confined firing spaces that spread throughout the fort.

The fort was manned by 307 artillerymen and 80 infantry under the command of Commandant-Captain Mozin.

== First World War ==
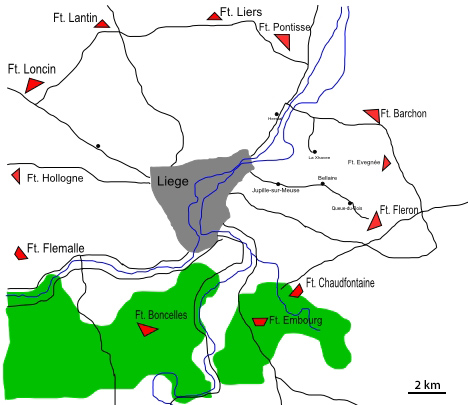
The Liège forts

The forts south and east of Liège first came under attack on 4 August 1914. Heavy German infantry attacks were met with unexpectedly strong resistance, resulting in heavy German casualties. When the Liège fortifications proved unexpectedly stubborn, the Germans brought heavy siege artillery to bombard the forts with shells far larger than they were designed to resist. German forces infiltrating between the forts captured the center of Liège on 6 August and were able to set up siege artillery in the city itself, attacking the forts from the rear. Fléron was hit with heavy artillery starting on the 11th, and by the next day was being hit at a rate of up to 250 shots per hour. A German delegation requesting the fort's surrender was turned away at midday, but conditions inside the bombarded fort were poor, and the fort's ammunition hoists were inoperable. That night the firing continued with close-range mortar fire. On the 13th a 42 cm gun opened fire. Commandant Mozin surrendered the fort at 0945 hours on the 14th, having lost the means to fight back and unable to remain in the asphyxiating fort. The fort suffered five killed in the battle. Twelve more died as prisoners of war.

== Fortified Position of Liège ==
Fléron's armament was upgraded in the 1930s to become part of the Fortified Position of Liège II, which was planned to deter a German incursion over the nearby border. The 21 cm turrets were replaced with longer-range 15 cm turrets, the original 15 cm turret was replaced by a turret with machine guns and grenade launchers, and the 12 cm turrets were replaced with turrets containing twin 105 mm guns. These new weapons were German in origin. Three 75 mm turrets were added as well. This was accompanied by improvements to ventilation, protection, sanitary facilities, communications and electrical power. An air intake tower was added on the other side of the now-vanished Line 38 railroad tracks, which has itself been demolished. New barracks were built at this time for peacetime accommodation. The fort was manned by 250 men, 20 non-commissioned officers and 13 officers.

== Second World War ==
From 10 May to 16 May 1940 Fléron was repeatedly attacked by air. The electrical system was destroyed the first day, compelling all firing adjustments and loading to be done by hand. The fort fired on German forces in the area, as well as providing covering fire to neighboring forts. Targets included the Citadel of Liège, the airport, and the Chàteau de Tancrémont. The fort also fired on attacking aircraft. Heavy aerial attacks on 17 May wrecked the communications center and the 15 cm turrets. The 105 mm guns ran out of ammunition, and a 75 mm gun was inoperable. The fort's commandant, Captain Gline, believed that the fort was no longer capable of effective resistance, and with the permission of his superiors released the garrison to join the field army. Four were killed and six wounded during the action.

== Present ==
The fort is no longer visible as a military structure, having been largely demolished and buried to make way for a housing development known as the Cité du Fort (City of the Fort). Unlike neighboring forts such as Fort de Loncin or Fort de Lantin, it does not house a museum and is primarily a residential area. One of the few remaining visible traces is the air intake tower, which was designed to resemble a water tower.

== Bibliography ==
- Donnell, Clayton, The Forts of the Meuse in World War I, Osprey Publishing, Oxford, 2007, ISBN 978-1-84603-114-4.
- Kauffmann, J.E., Jurga, R., Fortress Europe: European Fortifications of World War II, Da Capo Press, USA, 2002, ISBN 0-306-81174-X.
