= Fort de Barchon =

19th-20th century defence for Liège, Belgium

- Part of Fortified Position of Liège
- Barchon, Belgium
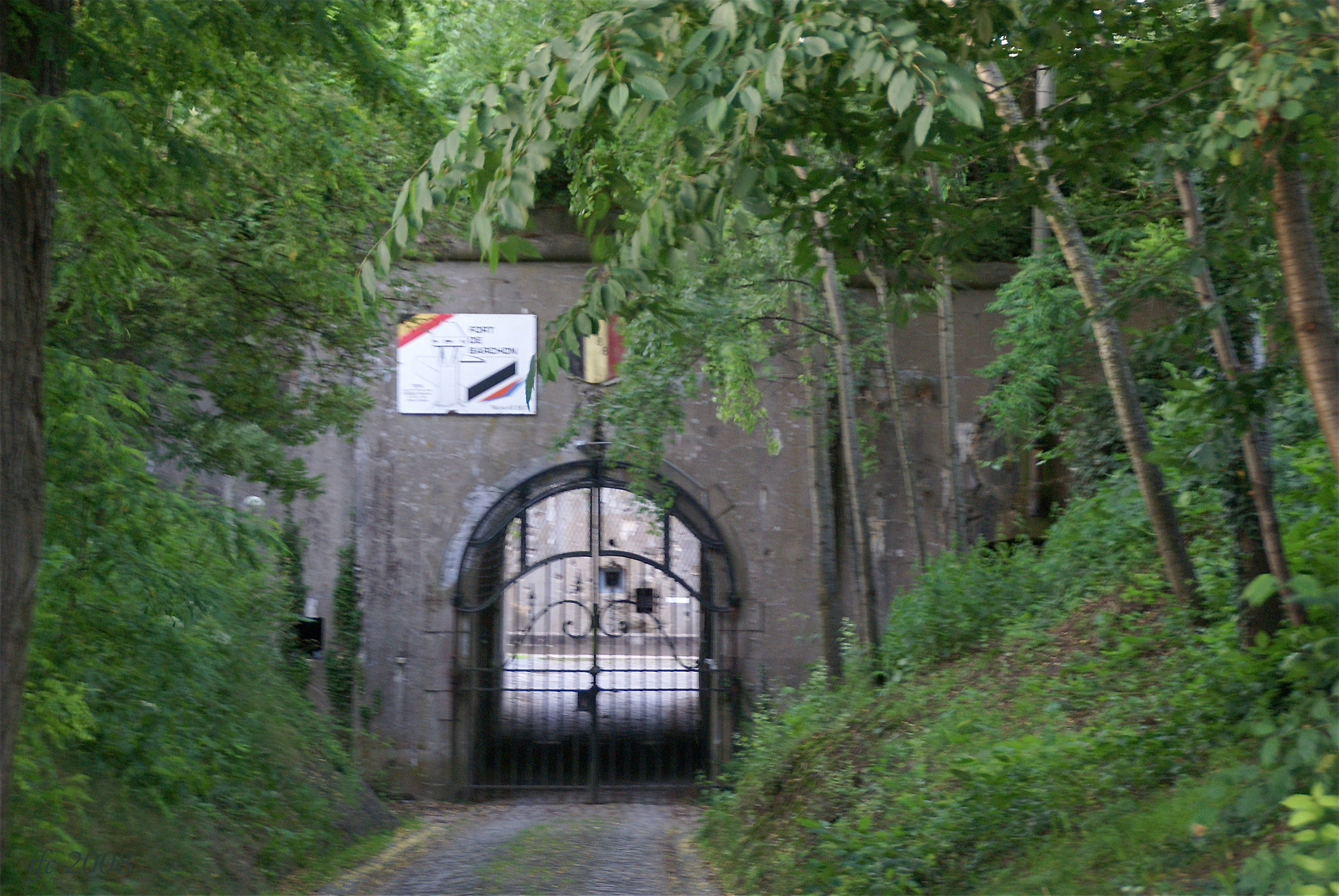
- Barchon entry

Site information
- Type: Fort
- Controlled by: Belgium
- Open to the public: Yes
- Condition: Preserved

Location
- Location within Belgium
- Coordinates: 50.6727°N 5.69091°E

Site history
- Built: 1881
- Materials: Unreinforced concrete
- Battles/wars: Battle of Liège, Battle of Belgium

The Fort de Barchon (French pronunciation: [fɔʁ də baʁʃɔ̃]) is one of twelve forts built around Liège, Belgium, in the late 19th century. The overall Fortified Position of Liège was a constituent part of the country's National Redoubt. Fort de Barchon was built between 1881 and 1884 according to the plans of General Henri Alexis Brialmont. Contrasting with the French forts built in the same era by Raymond Adolphe Séré de Rivières, the fort was built exclusively of unreinforced concrete, a new material, rather than masonry. The fort was heavily bombarded by German artillery in the Battle of Liège. Barchon was upgraded in the 1930s in an attempt to forestall or slow an attack from Germany. It saw action in 1940 during the Battle of Belgium, and was captured by German forces. It is preserved as a museum and may be visited by the public.

== Description ==
The Fort de Barchon is located about 9 kilometres (5.6 mi) northeast of the center of Liège, just off the E40 highway.

The fort forms an isosceles triangle whose base is 300 metres (980 ft) long and whose sides measure 235 metres (771 ft). A 6-metre (20 ft) deep by 8-metre (26 ft) ditch encircles the fort. The principal armament was concentrated in the central massif. The ditches were defended in enfilade by 57 mm guns in casemates resembling counterscarp batteries, firing at shot traps at the other end of the ditch. It is one of the larger forts of Liège.

With the exception of the Fort de Loncin, the Belgian forts made little provision for the daily needs of their wartime garrisons, locating latrines, showers, kitchens and the morgue in the fort's counterscarp, a location that would be untenable in combat. This would have profound effects on the forts' ability to endure a long assault. The service areas were placed directly opposite the barracks, which opened into the ditch in the rear of the fort (i.e., in the face towards Liège), with lesser protection than the two "salient" sides. The Brialmont forts placed a weaker side to the rear to allow for recapture by Belgian forces from the rear, and located the barracks and support facilities on this side, using the rear ditch for light and ventilation of living spaces. In combat heavy shellfire made the rear ditch untenable, and German forces were able to get between the forts and attack them from the rear.

The Brialmont forts were designed to be protected from shellfire equaling their heaviest guns: 21 cm. The top of the central massif used 4 metres (13 ft) of unreinforced concrete, while the caserne walls, judged to be less exposed, used 1.5 metres (4.9 ft). Under fire, the forts were damaged by 21 cm fire and could not withstand heavier artillery.

== Armament ==
Barchon's armament included two rotating Grüsonwerke turrets with a single 21 cm gun, a 15 cm Creusot turret with twin guns and two 12 cm Châtillon-Commentry turret with two guns, all for distant targets. Four retractable 57 mm Grüsonwerke gun turrets were provided for local defense. The fort also mounted an observation turret with a searchlight. Nine rapid-fire 57 mm Grüsonwerke guns were provided in casemates for the defense of the ditches and the postern, as well as two mobile guns.

The fort's heavy guns were German, typically Krupp, while the turret mechanisms were from a variety of sources. The fort was provided with signal lights to permit communication with the neighboring Fort de Loncin and Fort de Liers. The guns were fired using black powder rather than smokeless powder, producing choking gas in the confined firing spaces that spread throughout the fort.

The fort was defended by 300 artillery troops and 90 infantry, commanded by Captain-Commandant Hannefstingels.

== First World War ==
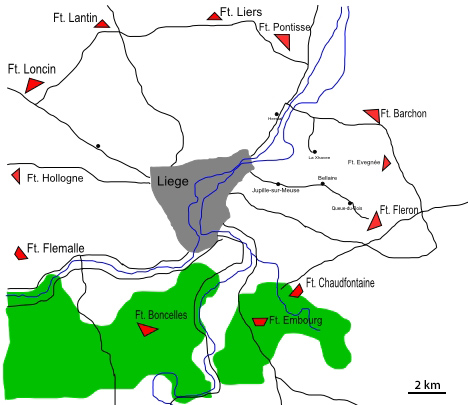
The Liège forts

Barchon first came under attack on 5 August 1914, a day before the city first came under fire. On the 6th German forces seeking to infiltrate between Barchon and the Meuse were forced to retreat. Because the Liège fortifications had proved to be unexpectedly stubborn, the Germans brought heavy siege artillery to bombard the forts with shells far larger than they were designed to resist. Barchon was heavily bombarded starting 8 August with 21 cm artillery. The fort's surrender was demanded under a flag of truce: once refused, the bombardment recommenced. Much of the fort's armament was damaged, and the air became unbreathable. Barchon surrendered at 1600 hours, the first of the Liège forts to do so. Twenty-two of the garrison had been killed.

In 1915 the Germans undertook an improvement program for Barchon and other Liège positions, modifying the entrance, adding concrete cover and adding metal decking under concrete ceilings. Non-structural improvements included forced ventilation and moving latrines, kitchens and the bakery into the main fort.

== Fortified Position of Liège ==
Barchon's armament was upgraded in the 1930s to become part of the Fortified Position of Liège II, which was planned to deter a German incursion over the nearby border. The 21 cm turrets were replaced with longer-range 15 cm turrets, the 15 cm turret was replaced by a turret with machine guns and grenade launchers, and the 12 cm turrets were replaced with turrets containing twin 105 mm guns. Twin twin 120 mm mortars were added. These new weapons were German in origin. Five 75 mm turrets were added as well as an anti-aircraft battery of machine guns. Protection was substantially increased. This was accompanied by improvements to ventilation, protection, sanitary facilities, communications and electrical power. A fortified air intake tower was provided to improve ventilation. New barracks were built at this time for peacetime accommodation. The fort also featured a pigeon loft for carrier pigeons. The fort was defended by 221 soldiers, 53 non-commissioned officers and 11 officers, under the command of Captain-Commandant Pourbaix.

== Second World War ==
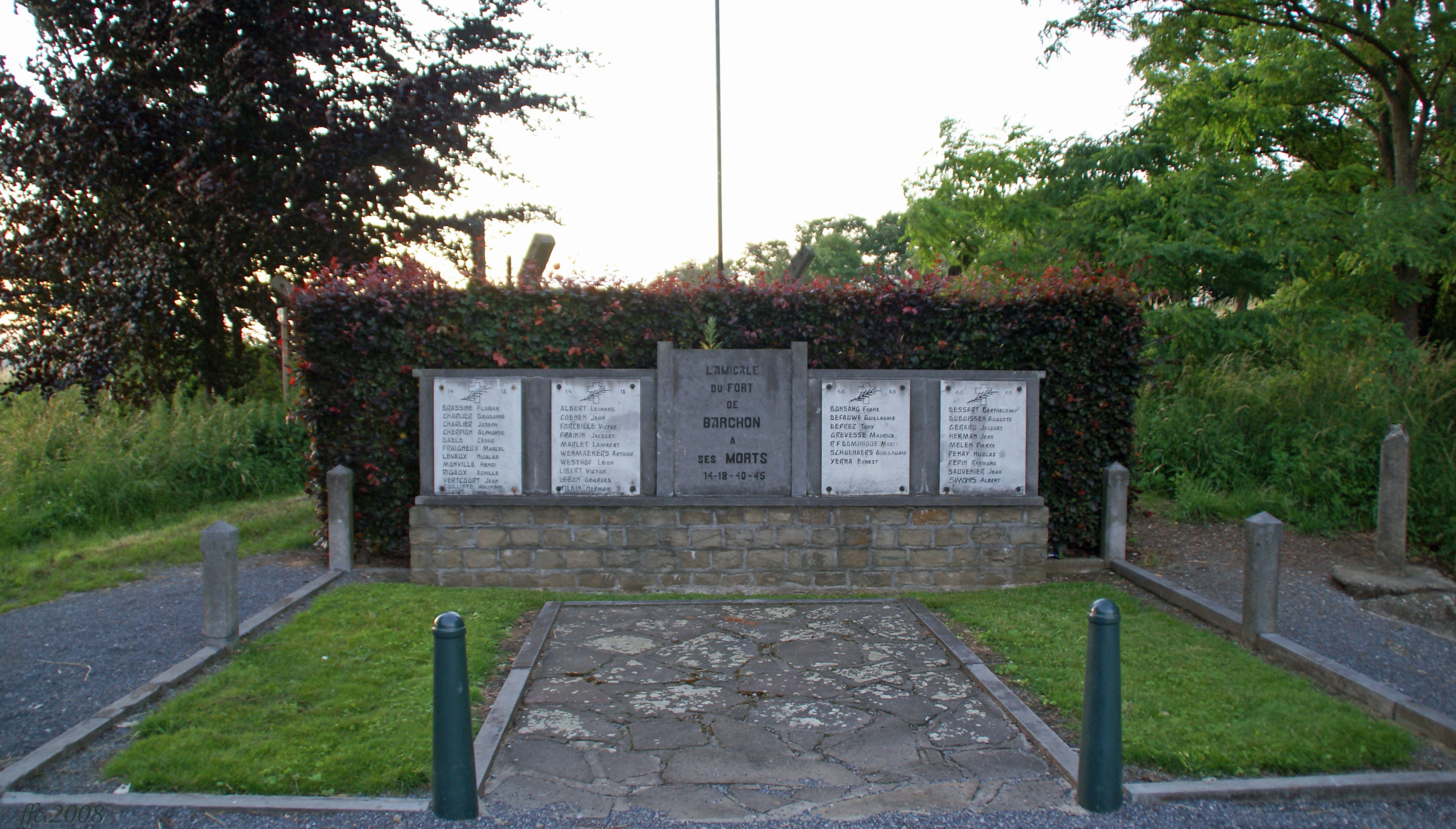
Barchon war memorial

Barchon opened fire on the morning of 10 May in support of Fort Eben-Emael with 15 cm guns. The anti-aircraft battery shot down a German aircraft. Belgian Army field forces withdrew on 11 May, leaving the Liège forts to fight alone. Barchon continued to support Eben-Emael and Aubin-Neufchâteau. On the 12th the fort was directly attacked by German infantry. The next day Barchon was heavily bombarded by artillery. One of the 75 mm guns was overcharged and exploded. Bombardment and infantry attacks continued through the 17th, when the fort was attacked by air. Heavily damaged, the fort fought into the 18th, when the 105 mm turret was knocked out. The Germans requested surrender, whereupon the artillery and aerial bombardments resumed. The Germans mounted an infantry assault in the afternoon, supported by flamethrowers, that took the fort at 1800 hours. The garrison suffered four dead and twenty-two wounded.

== Present ==
The fort has been restored by and is operated by a preservation organization. The fort's air intake tower remains as a prominent landmark. It is also used as an Airsoft arena.

== Bibliography ==
- Donnell, Clayton, The Forts of the Meuse in World War I, Osprey Publishing, Oxford, 2007, ISBN 978-1-84603-114-4.
- Kauffmann, J.E., Jurga, R., Fortress Europe: European Fortifications of World War II, Da Capo Press, USA, 2002, ISBN 0-306-81174-X.
