= Harold Marshall (sniper) =

Canadian scout and sniper sergeant (1918-2013)

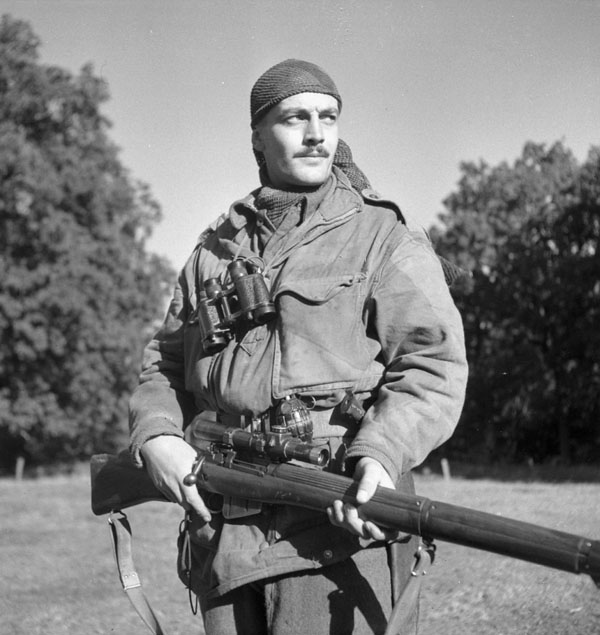
- Ken Bell photo (PAC)
- Born: 10 February 1918; Canada
- Died: 19 January 2013 (aged 94); Calgary, Canada
- Military career
- Allegiance: Canada
- Branch: Canadian Army
- Service years: Second World War
- Rank: Sergeant
- Unit: The Calgary Highlanders
- Conflicts: World War II: Battle of Normandy; Battle of the Scheldt
- Awards: 1939–1945 Star; 1939–45 War Medal; Defence Medal; Canadian Volunteer Service Medal with Clasp; France-Germany Star

Harold A. Marshall (10 February 1918 – 18 January 2013) was a Canadian scout and sniper sergeant who served in the Second World War with the Calgary Highlanders' Scout and Sniper Platoon.

On 30 January 1942 the Hamilton Spectator mentioned him in an article about ongoing training simulations the Highlanders were engaged in at an undisclosed location in England.

He was wounded on 15 December 1944.

The well-known photograph shown here was taken by Army photographer Ken Bell of the Canadian Army Film and Photo Unit near Fort Brasschaat (nl) in Belgium in September 1944. He is carrying a Lee–Enfield No. 4 Mk 1 (T). The T signifies 'Telescopic'. He is wearing a modified version of the Denison smock. Other equipment includes a No. 36M grenade and a camouflage face veil worn as a head covering. The handle of an edged tool (a kukhri) can be seen above his belt at his left side. A different photo of the sergeant and spotter Corporal S. Kormendy in Kapellen, Belgium, 6 October 1944, clearly shows his kukri on the left side.

In 1973, he was profiled again for Bell's commemorative book Not in Vain, which showed him as a curling enthusiast back in Calgary.
