= Fort de Flémalle =

19th-20th century defence for Liège, Belgium

- Part of Fortified Position of Liège
- Flémalle, Belgium
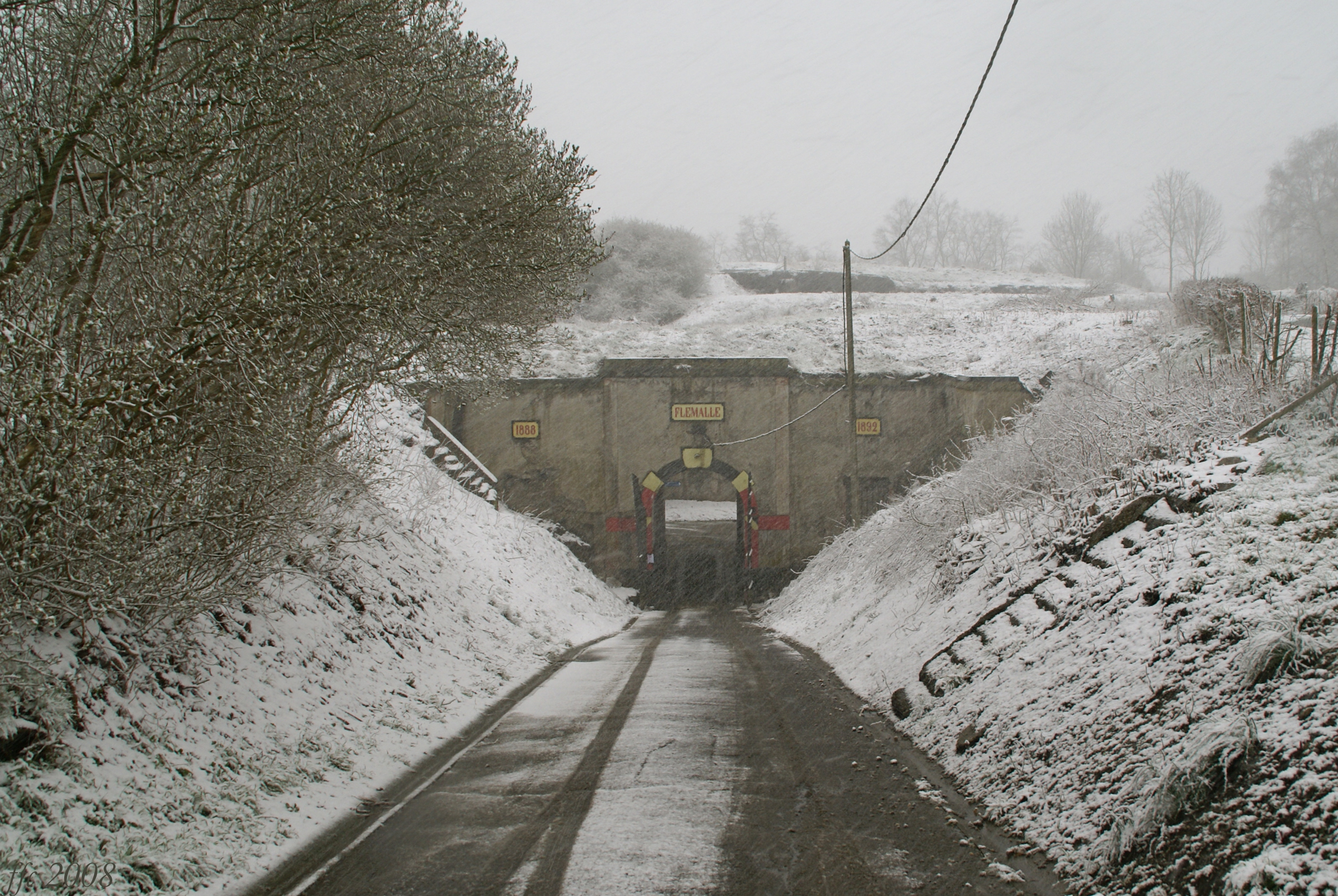
- Entry, Fort de Flémalle

Site information
- Type: Fort
- Controlled by: Belgium
- Open to the public: Yes
- Condition: Preserved

Location
- Location within Belgium
- Coordinates: 50.60768°N 5.46504°E

Site history
- Built: 1881
- Materials: Unreinforced concrete
- Battles/wars: Battle of Liège, Battle of Belgium

The Fort de Flémalle (French pronunciation: [fɔʁ də flemal]) is one of twelve forts built around Liège, Belgium, in the late 19th century. The overall Fortified Position of Liège was a constituent part of the country's National Redoubt. Fort de Flémalle was built between 1881 and 1884 according to the plans of General Henri Alexis Brialmont. Contrasting with the French forts built in the same era by Raymond Adolphe Séré de Rivières, the fort was built exclusively of unreinforced concrete, a new material, rather than masonry. The fort was heavily bombarded by German artillery in the Battle of Liège. Attacked in both World War I and World War II, the fort has been preserved as a museum.

== Description ==
The Fort de Flémalle is located about 7 kilometres (4.3 mi) southwest of the center of Liège. Flémalle overlooks the Meuse valley upstream from Liège.

The fort was built as an irregular trapezoid, almost triangular. A 6-metre (20 ft) deep by 8-metre (26 ft) ditch encircles the fort. The principal armament was concentrated in the central massif. The ditches were defended in enfilade by 57 mm guns in casemates resembling counterscarp batteries, firing at shot traps at the other end of the ditch. The fort is one of the larger Liège forts.

With the exception of the Fort de Loncin, the Belgian forts made little provision for the daily needs of their wartime garrisons, locating latrines, showers, kitchens and the morgue in the fort's counterscarp, a location that would be untenable in combat. This would have profound effects on the forts' ability to endure a long assault. The service areas were placed directly opposite the barracks, which opened into the ditch in the rear of the fort (i.e., in the face towards Liège), with lesser protection than the two "salient" sides. The Brialmont forts placed a weaker side to the rear to allow for recapture by Belgian forces from the rear, and located the barracks and support facilities on this side, using the rear ditch for light and ventilation of living spaces. In combat, heavy shellfire made the rear ditch untenable, and German forces were able to get between the forts and attack them from the rear.

The Brialmont forts were designed to be protected from shellfire equaling their heaviest guns: 21 cm. The top of the central massif used 4 metres (13 ft) of unreinforced concrete, while the caserne walls, judged to be less exposed, used 1.5 metres (4.9 ft). Under fire, the forts were damaged by 21 cm fire and could not withstand heavier artillery.

== Armament ==
Flémalle's armament included two turrets with a single 21 cm Krupp gun, a 15 cm turret with twin guns, and two 12 cm turrets with two Krupp guns each, all for distant targets. Four 57 mm gun turrets were provided for local defense. The fort also mounted an observation turret with a searchlight. Eleven rapid-fire 57 mm guns were provided in casemates for the defense of the ditches and the postern.

The fort's heavy guns were German, typically Krupp, while the turret mechanisms were from a variety of sources. The fort was provided with signal lights to permit communication with the neighboring Fort de Loncin and Fort de Liers. The guns were fired using black powder rather than smokeless powder, producing choking gas in the confined firing spaces that spread throughout the fort.

== First World War ==
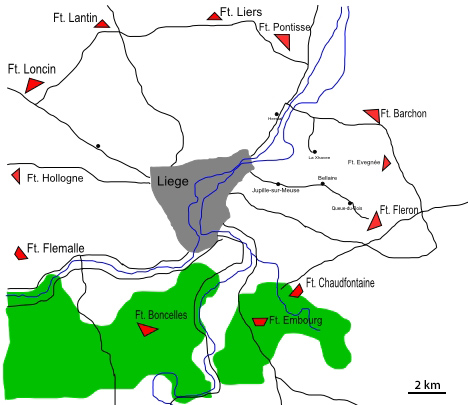
The Liège forts

In 1914, Fort de Flémalle was commanded by Captain-Commandant Falize, leading a garrison of five officers and 150 men. The Fortified Position of Liège first came under German attack on 6 August 1914. When the Belgian fortifications proved unexpectedly stubborn, the Germans brought up heavy siege artillery — including 21 cm mortars and 42 cm "Big Bertha" howitzers — to bombard the forts with shells far larger than the 21 cm calibers Brialmont had originally designed them to withstand.

=== Structural Vulnerabilities and Siege ===
During heavy bombardment, severe inherent design flaws severely undermined the garrison's ability to resist:

- Atmospheric and Gas Hazard: Flémalle relied on black powder rather than smokeless powder for its guns, which generated choking, asphyxiating fumes in the firing casemates that rapidly spread through the unventilated interior.
- Compromised Facilities: Key service areas — including kitchens, latrines, and living quarters — were located in the outer counterscarp across the open rear ditch. Under sustained heavy artillery fire, the rear ditch became completely untenable, severing the garrison from essential supplies and forcing troops to retreat into the central concrete massif.

Despite these conditions, Flémalle was one of the last forts to come under direct bombardment and remained among the final two Belgian holdouts alongside Fort de Hollogne. Following the catastrophic explosion of Fort de Loncin, the Germans dispatched delegations to both remaining positions, warning of imminent destruction if they continued to resist. Seeing that further defense was futile, Captain-Commandant Falize surrendered Fort de Flémalle at 09:30 on 16 August 1914, two hours after Hollogne.

== Interwar Modernization ==
During the 1930s, Fort de Flémalle was modernized as part of the Fortified Position of Liège II (PFL II) to deter a potential German invasion. Its original 19th-century Krupp guns were decommissioned and replaced with modern turrets housing 105 mm and 150 mm artillery, alongside four single 75 mm guns in retractable turrets and specialized machine gun cloches developed by the Fonderie Royale des Canons (FRC). The 57 mm guns were replaced with machine guns, and six anti-aircraft guns were installed. These armament changes were accompanied by comprehensive upgrades to the fort's ventilation, sanitation, electrical power, and communication systems.

== Second World War ==
In May 1940, the garrison was commanded by Captain-Commandant F. Barbieux, with five officers and approximately 150 men. Following the German assault on Fort Eben-Emael to the east, Flémalle provided supporting artillery fire for neighboring forts and Belgian field units over the next several days.

On 15 May, the fort was subjected to intense air strikes by the Luftwaffe, which destroyed its gun turrets and damaged its ventilation systems. German ground forces surrounded and attacked the fort the following day. Incapable of mounting further effective resistance, the garrison surrendered on 16 May 1940.

== Present ==
Flémalle was partly stripped of its equipment during the German occupation, and again by a salvager in the 1960s. The fort has been maintained by a preservation association since 1992, which has established a museum in the fort.

== Bibliography ==
- Donnell, Clayton, The Forts of the Meuse in World War I, Osprey Publishing, Oxford, 2007, ISBN 978-1-84603-114-4.
- Kauffmann, J.E., Jurga, R., Fortress Europe: European Fortifications of World War II, Da Capo Press, USA, 2002, ISBN 0-306-81174-X.
