= Fort de Hollogne =

19th-20th century defence for Liège, Belgium

- Part of Fortified Position of Liège
- Hollogne, Belgium

Site information
- Type: Fort
- Owner: Liège Airport Authority
- Controlled by: Belgium
- Open to the public: Yes
- Condition: Preserved

Location
- Coordinates: 50.64631°N 5.46602°E

Site history
- Built: 1881
- Materials: Unreinforced concrete
- Battles/wars: Battle of Liège, Battle of Belgium

The Fort de Hollogne (French pronunciation: [fɔʁ də ɔlɔɲ]) is one of twelve forts built around Liège, Belgium, in the late 19th century. The overall Fortified Position of Liège was a constituent part of the country's National Redoubt. Fort de Hollogne was built between 1881 and 1884 according to the plans of General Henri Alexis Brialmont. Contrasting with the French forts built in the same era by Raymond Adolphe Séré de Rivières, the fort was built exclusively of unreinforced concrete, a new material, rather than masonry. The fort was heavily bombarded by German artillery in the Battle of Liège. Hollogne was never upgraded like the other forts of Liège and retains its character as a Brialmont fort. It is preserved as a museum and may be visited by the public.

== Description ==
The Fort de Hollogne is located about 7 kilometres (4.3 mi) west of the Liège city centre, directly adjacent to the Liège Airport's runway.

The fort forms an isosceles triangle whose base is 200 metres (660 ft) long and whose sides measure 225 metres (738 ft). A 6-metre (20 ft) deep by 8-metre (26 ft) ditch encircles the fort. The principal armament was concentrated in the central massif. The ditches were defended in enfilade by 57 mm guns in casemates resembling counterscarp batteries, firing at shot traps at the other end of the ditch. It is one of the smaller forts of Liège.

With the exception of the Fort de Loncin, the Belgian forts made little provision for the daily needs of their wartime garrisons, locating latrines, showers, kitchens and the morgue in the fort's counterscarp, a location that would be untenable in combat. This would have profound effects on the forts' ability to endure a long assault. The service areas were placed directly opposite the barracks, which opened into the ditch in the rear of the fort (i.e., in the face towards Liège), with less protection than the two "salient" sides. The Brialmont forts placed a weaker side to the rear to allow for recapture by Belgian forces from the rear, and located the barracks and support facilities on this side, using the rear ditch for light and ventilation of living spaces. In combat heavy shellfire made the rear ditch untenable, and German forces were able to get between the forts and attack them from the rear.

The Brialmont forts were designed to be protected from shellfire equaling their heaviest guns: 21 cm. The top of the central massif used 4 metres (13 ft) of unreinforced concrete, while the caserne walls, judged to be less exposed, used 1.5 metres (4.9 ft). Under fire, the forts were damaged by 21 cm fire and could not withstand heavier artillery.

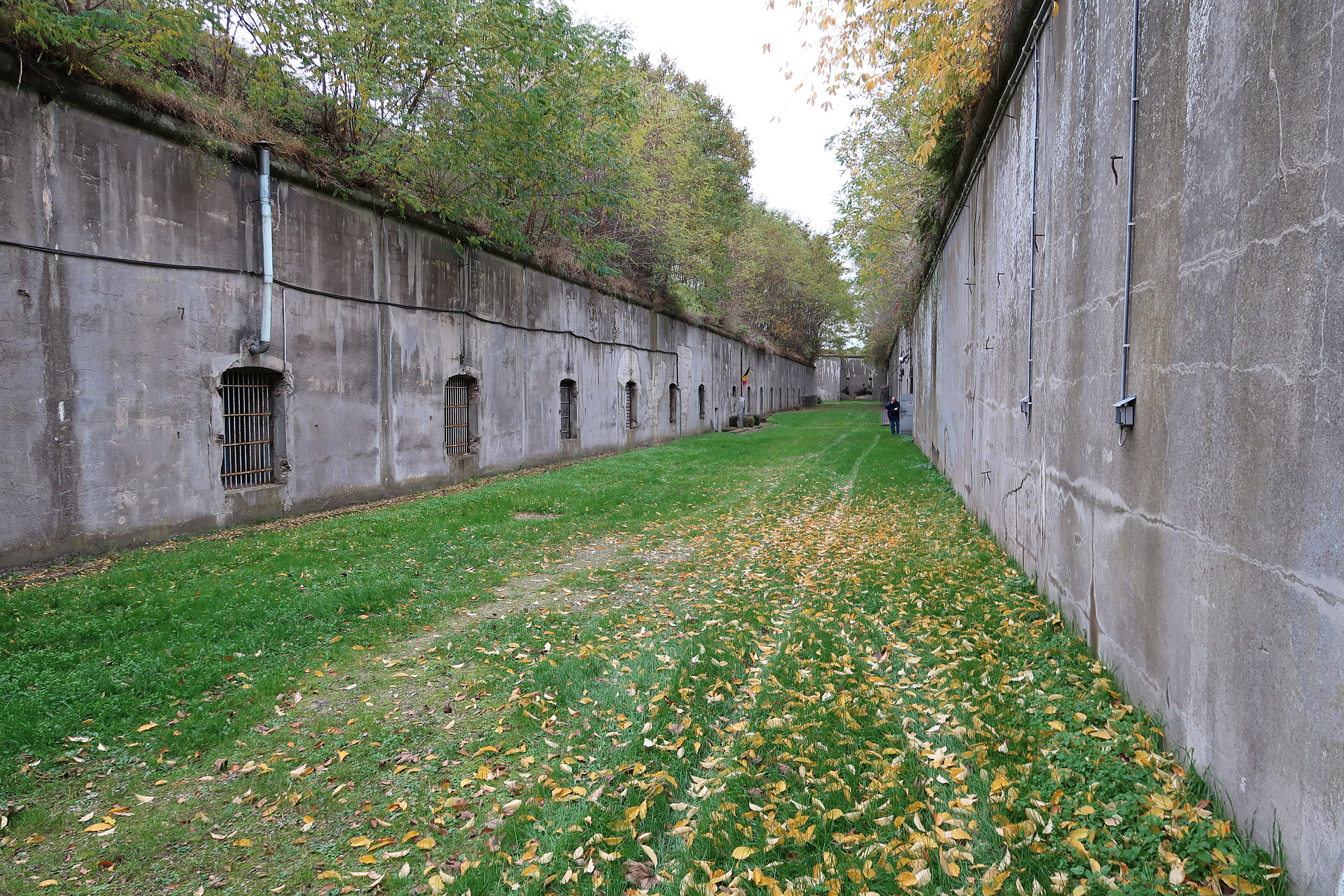

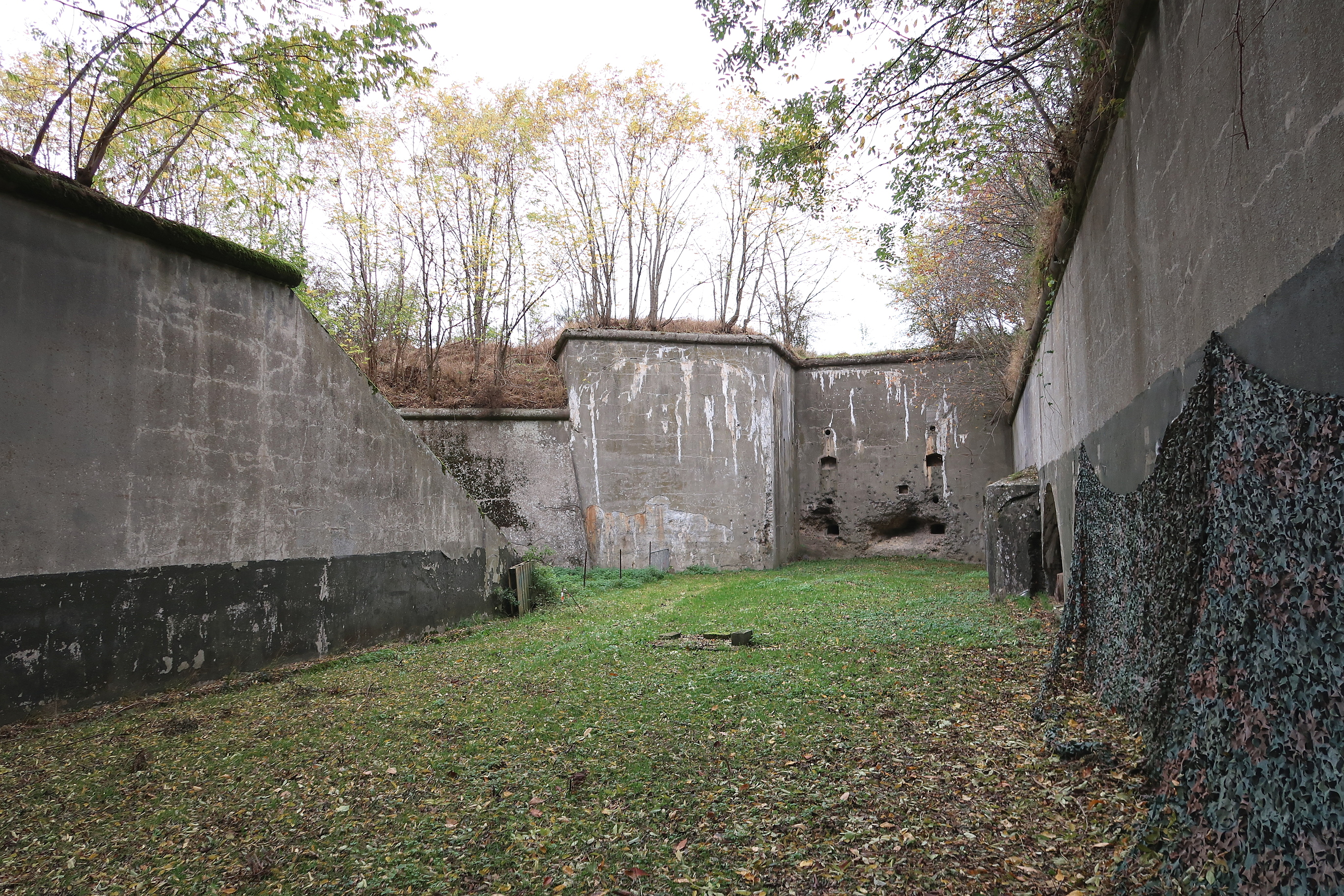

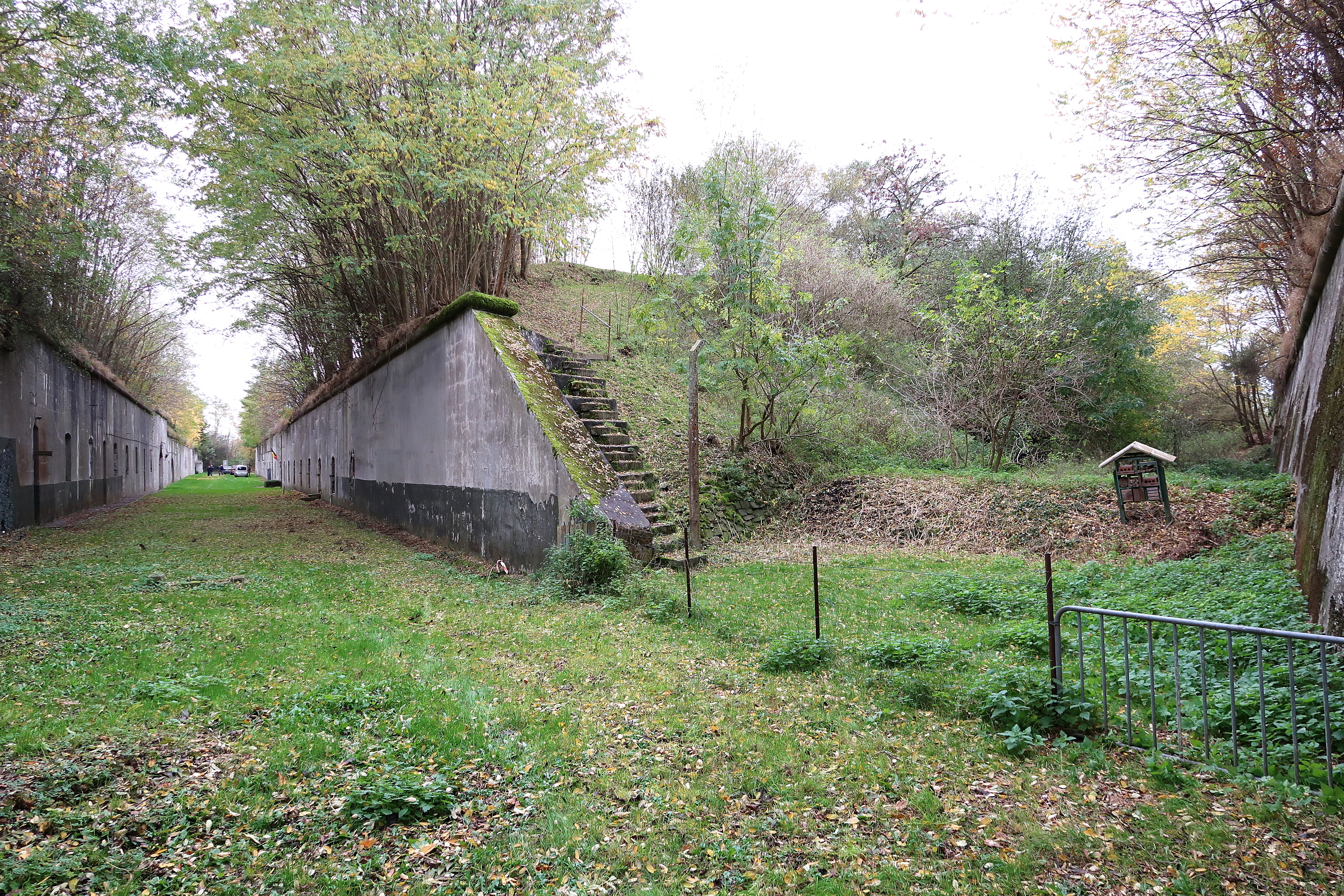

== Armament ==
Hollogne's armament included a Grusonwerke turret with a single 21 cm gun, a 15 cm Creusot-Vanekerchove turret with twin guns and a 12 cm Châtillon-Commentry/Marcinelle et Couillet turret with two guns, all for distant targets. 57 mm gun turrets were provided for local defense. The fort also mounted an observation turret with a searchlight. Seven rapid-fire 57 mm Grusonwerke guns were provided in casemates for the defense of the ditches and the postern, as well as in three turrets.

The fort's heavy guns were German, typically Krupp, while the turret mechanisms were from a variety of sources. The fort was provided with signal lights to permit communication with the neighboring Fort de Loncin and Fort de Liers. The guns were fired using black powder rather than smokeless powder, producing choking gas in the confined firing spaces that spread throughout the fort.

The fort was manned by 230 artillerymen and 120 infantry, commanded by Captain-Commandant Cuisinier.

== First World War ==
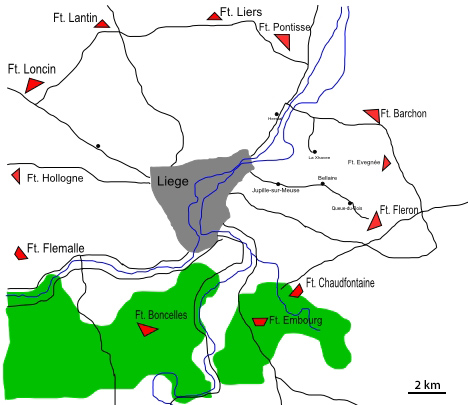
The Liège forts

Liège first came under attack on 6 August 1914. When the Liège's fortifications proved unexpectedly stubborn, the Germans brought heavy siege artillery to bombard the forts with shells far larger than they were designed to resist. Hollogne was heavily bombarded starting 13 August. On 15 August the neighboring Fort de Loncin exploded under bombardment at 1720 hours. At 1900 hours a German delegation arrived and offered to take the commandant to see the wreckage of Loncin. The fort's doctor and another officer went to Loncin, reporting back at 2200. A plan was then proposed the evacuate and blow up the fort, which was stymied when the garrison discovered that it was surrounded. German artillery bombardment recommenced the next day; Hologne surrendered at 0730 on the 16th, the next-to-last Liège fort to capitulate.

== Second World War ==
Hollogne was not upgraded in the 1930s as part of the Fortified Position of Liège, remaining essentially as it was built by Brialmont, with a few modifications by the 1914-1917 German occupiers. The Belgian Army used the fort to store munitions. In May 1940 the fort was bombed by Stukas that had mistaken Hollogne for the active Fort de Flémalle. During the second occupation the fort was proposed as a launching site for V-2 rockets. After the area was liberated in 1944 it was used by American forces as a hospital. Following the conclusion of the war it became a depot for Belgian forces, then became a Belgian Air Force command post until 1992. It remained Ministry of Defense property until 1997, when it was conveyed to the Ministry of Transport as airport property.

== Present ==
The fort has been restored by and is operated by the preservation organization Comité de Sauvegarde du Patrimoine Historique du Fort de Hollogne. It is open for public tours at stated times.

== Bibliography ==
- Donnell, Clayton, The Forts of the Meuse in World War I, Osprey Publishing, Oxford, 2007, ISBN 978-1-84603-114-4.
- Kauffmann, J.E., Jurga, R., Fortress Europe: European Fortifications of World War II, Da Capo Press, USA, 2002, ISBN 0-306-81174-X.
