= Fort of Stabroek =

Coordinates: 51°20′32″N 4°21′10″E

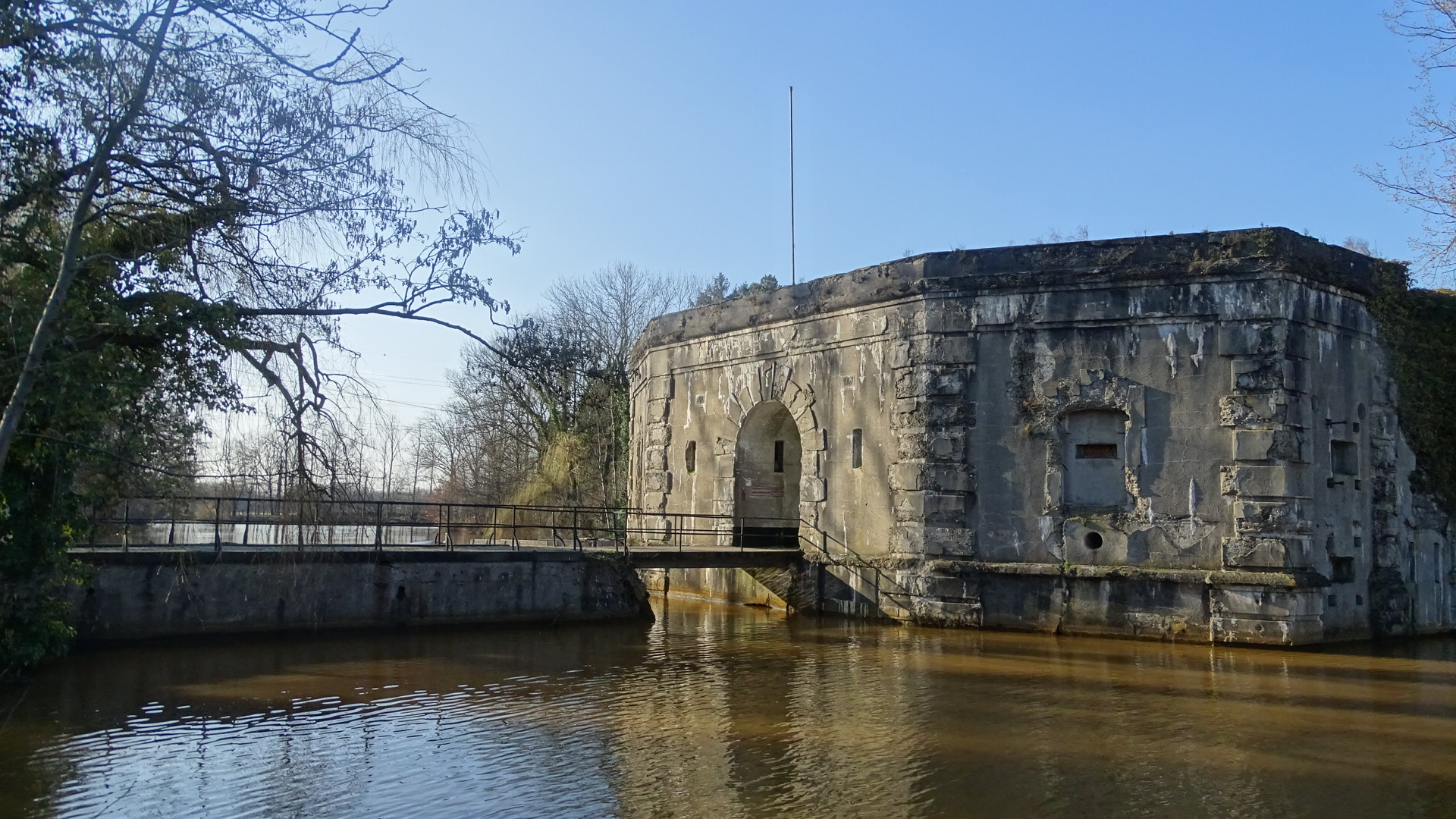
Fort of Stabroek

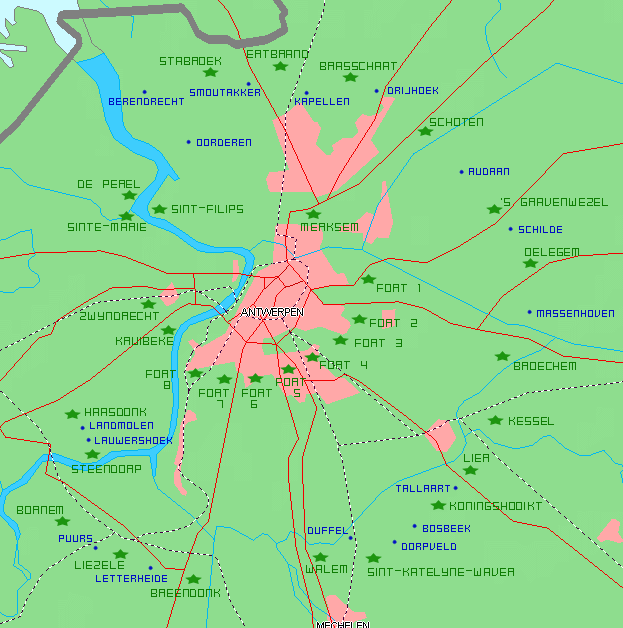
The ring of forts around Antwerp. Stabroek is positioned approximately north-north-west of the city, close to the frontier with the Netherlands.

The Fort of Stabroek dates from 1902. It is one of a ring of forts surrounding Antwerp, built after the city had been identified as Belgium's National redoubt (final stronghold) to which the army and government could retreat and await allied intervention in the event of military attack from abroad. It is constructed of reinforced concrete with a trapezoidal footprint, and surrounded by a moat, which here forms a part of the Antitank canal constructed between 1937 and 1939. Together with the Fort of Sint-Katelijne-Waver (to the south of the city) the Fort of Stabroek was one of the first two "armoured forts" in Antwerp, intended to withstand shells of up to 22 cm.

Construction, mandated in 1900, progressed only with delays, starting in 1902. The fort was completed in 1907 or 1908. However, it never received the heavy artillery pieces which had been intended for it, and by the time war did break out, in 1914, attack came not from France but from Germany, and the Germans were using artillery shells of 30.5 cm or, in the case of the so-called Big Bertha guns, of 42 cm.

Before construction could start, 9 people had to be dispossessed of land, but the overall impact of the construction project was nevertheless overwhelmingly positive. Many Wallonian guest workers were brought in from Geldenaken, providing welcome additional income for caterers and other local businesses. During excavations in preparation for the construction three former river channels were identified, which were featured in a series of articles produced by Georges Hasse on the history of the rivers in the northern part of the province.

Stabroek is a "second order" fort incorporating two semi-detached caponiers. Because these are not directly beside the main part of the fort, the linking trenches are protected with two little supplementary 5.7 cm gun turrets. All together there were one turret for two 15 cm guns, two each for a 12 cm Howitzers and four for 7.5 cm guns.

The outbreak of the First World War involved a German invasion of Belgium, and two months later the German army began to besiege Antwerp. The intense fighting mostly took place on the south and eastern side of the city, and it is evident that the National redoubt of fortresses surrounding Antwerp held up the German invasion. Nevertheless, on 7 October 1914 the king gave orders to evacuate the Fort of Stabroek, and the fighting moved on towards the coast in the west. Just over a quarter century later Belgium faced another overwhelming German invasion, following the outbreak of the Second World War. Defensive preparations during the late 1930s had included the creation of an Antitank canal round Antwerp, of which the moat round the Fort of Stabroek formed a part. In the event, however, May 1940 marked the start of another four years of German military occupation.

A couple of years after the war ended, formally in May 1945, on 2 April 1947 the Fort of Stabroek formally lost its military status, less than half a century after its construction. In 1955 it was sold to a dentist from Beveren called Albert Callens. The structure was initially used as a private country retreat, and later for growing mushrooms. The moat was used for recreational purposes such as fishing and swimming. The basic fabric remains sound, and following recent upgrades the Fort of Stabroek, now run by the dentist's grandson, offers recreational activities that include fort climbing and paint balling.
