= Fort Ertbrand =

Belgian fort near Antwerp, Belgium

Coordinates: 51.3475°N 4.4261°E

An old photo of Fort Ertbrand. The photo was taken from across the moat that surrounds the fort.

Fort Ertbrand is a Belgian fortification located near the town of Putte, Antwerp, Belgium. Fort Ertbrand was part of the third and final phase of defenses constructed around Antwerp. The fort was also part of the last defenses constructed in the National Redoubt.

== Construction ==
Fort Ertbrand was constructed between 1908 and 1912 and is a trapezoidal shape. The fort is located on its own artificial island within Antwerp. The process of arming Fort Ertbrand and the other new fortifications around Antwerp was in progress when Germany invaded in August 1914.

== History ==
Fort Ertbrand was garrisoned by 500 soldiers when Germany invaded in August 1914 but didn't see any action because the Germans besieged Antwerp from the south. The fort was armed with:

- Two 15 cm howitzers in 22-centimeter-thick revolving armored domes
- Two 12 cm howitzers in 22-centimeter-thick revolving armored domes
- Four 7.5 cm guns in 22-centimeter-thick revolving armored domes
- Six 5.7 cm guns in 22-centimeter-thick armored domes
- Fourteen 5.7 cm guns in casemates
- Four 12 cm howitzers in casemates
- Eight 7.5 cm guns in casemates
- Four 30 cm spotlights
- Two 90 cm spotlights

Some of the embrasures from which the close-defense guns were fired

In 1917, Germany included Fort Ertbrand in the defensive plans of the area. During the inter-war period, a gas-lock was added, alongside the anti-tank moat that surrounds the fort. All of this work was for nought because Fort Ertbrand was abandoned on May 17, 1940. After the war, Belgian authorities used the fort as a center for the Belgian Demining Service, which disarmed munitions from during the war. Shortly afterwards, the fort was abandoned because it was no longer useful. The fort was sold to a private individual who used it as a hunting reserve for many years. Today, Fort Ertbrand is owned by the Belgian non-profit Natuurpunt, which conserves the site because a rare species of bats hibernate in it. Visitors can also walk around the fort during the summer.
