= Canadian Army Film and Photo Unit =

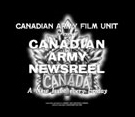
- Symbol of the Canadian Army Film and Photo Unit.
- Active: 1941-1945
- Country: Canada
- Branch: Canadian Army
- Engagements: Normandy Landings; Elbe Day; Allied invasion of Sicily; Operation Market Garden; Liberation of Paris

Insignia
- Abbreviation: CAFPU

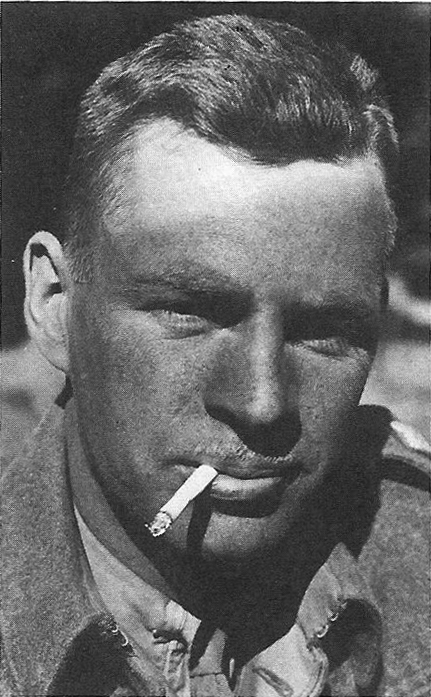
Lieutenant Ken Bell of the CFPU, who landed at Juno Beach on D-Day with The Highland Light Infantry of Canada

The Canadian Army Film and Photo Unit (CFPU) was a Canadian Army unit founded in 1941 in order to document military operations during World War II. It was the last unit of its kind to be founded by the Allied armies. Among the campaigns which it recorded were the invasion of Sicily, the D-Day landings, the liberation of Paris and the Elbe River link-up of the Allied armies, known as 'Elbe Day'.

== History ==
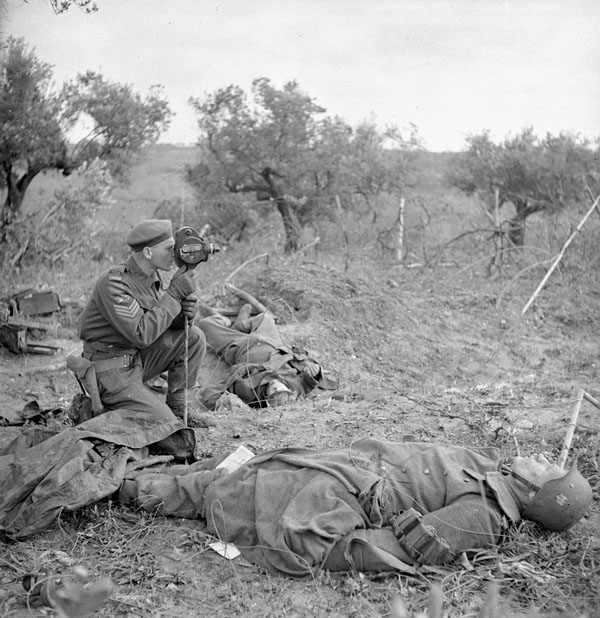
Sergeant George A. Game of the Canadian Army Film and Photo Unit operating his camera near San Leonardo di Ortona, Italy, December 10, 1943

The first official Canadian army photographer was Lieutenant Laurie Audrain of Winnipeg; he was appointed on June 25, 1940. However, it was soon recognized that a dedicated photographic unit was necessary. The CFPU was formed on June 19, 1941 under the command of Captain William Abell of Winnipeg. By the end of World War II, fifty nine Canadian photographers and cameramen had been involved in combat operations in Europe. Of these, six were killed and eighteen were wounded.

The CFPU was staffed by enlisted men and women. Its objectives were to film Canadian troops in action and supply the Department of National Defence, and also media outlets, with theatrical newsreels and still photographs. It was the first Allied unit to provide film of the assault waves landing in Sicily and Normandy, the first to get still pictures from Normandy onto the front pages of the world press, and the only one to produce colour pictures of Operation Overlord.

Among its members were:

- Bill Grant , who was the first Allied cameraman ashore on D-Day. Grant's film of Canadian soldiers disembarking under fire on Juno Beach is among the most iconic footage of the D-Day Landings.
- Al Calder, who parachuted over the Rhine during Operation Market Garden, (General Montgomery's bold but ultimately unsuccessful attempt to bring the war to an end by Christmas 1944).
- Lieutenant Ken Bell, who landed on Juno Beach on D-Day with The Highland Light Infantry of Canada, and shot the only surviving colour footage of D-Day.
- Llewellyn Weekes, who shot the liberation of Paris.
- Sergeant D.W. Grant, who on D-Day filmed approximately two minutes of motion picture footage of soldiers of The North Shore Regiment landing at Bernières-sur-Mer. The film was quickly sent to England and cleared for distribution by news outlets.

Members of the CFPU were often in the front line, sometimes even ahead of it. During the liberation of Dieppe in 1944, as the Manitoba Dragoons awaited orders to advance, members of the CFPU including Ken Bell and Brian O'Regan were the first Allied servicemen to enter the town.

In April 1945 the journalist Lionel Shapiro wrote in Maclean's magazine:

"CFPU men were in the thick of every battle, often moving with the most forward units, on a few occasions positioning themselves at a vantage point in no-man's land in anticipation of a clash."

== Modern era and legacy ==
Today, Ken Bell's war photographs - taken with a Rolleiflex camera - are housed by the Library and Archives Canada., in Ottawa. After the war, Bell published a number of photographic memoirs of his experiences with the CFPU, including Curtain Call, published in 1953, and Not in Vain, published in 1973.

In 2005, a one-hour documentary titled Shooters was made by James O'Regan, son of CFPU member Brian O'Regan, showing the history of the CFPU and broadcast on the CBC. The eBook, Camera Commandos, by Brian O'Regan, was also published.

== Gallery ==
=== Photo Unit ===
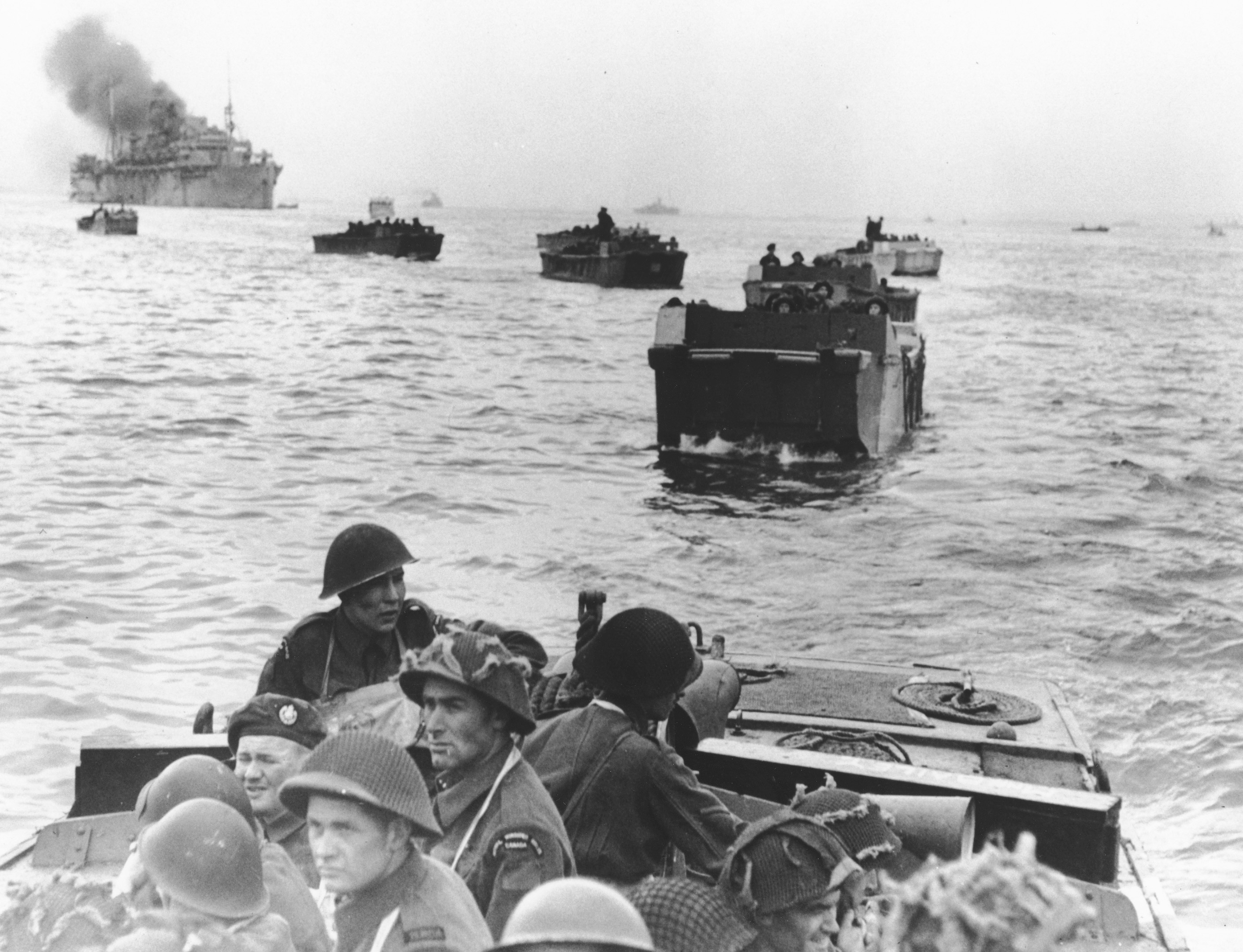
The Royal Winnipeg Rifles aboard LCAs in the 1st wave, D-Day, June 6, 1944

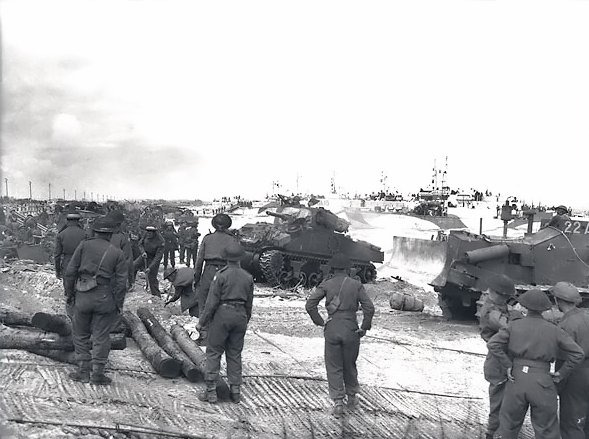
A crowded beach at Courseulles-sur-Mer, D-Day, June 6, 1944

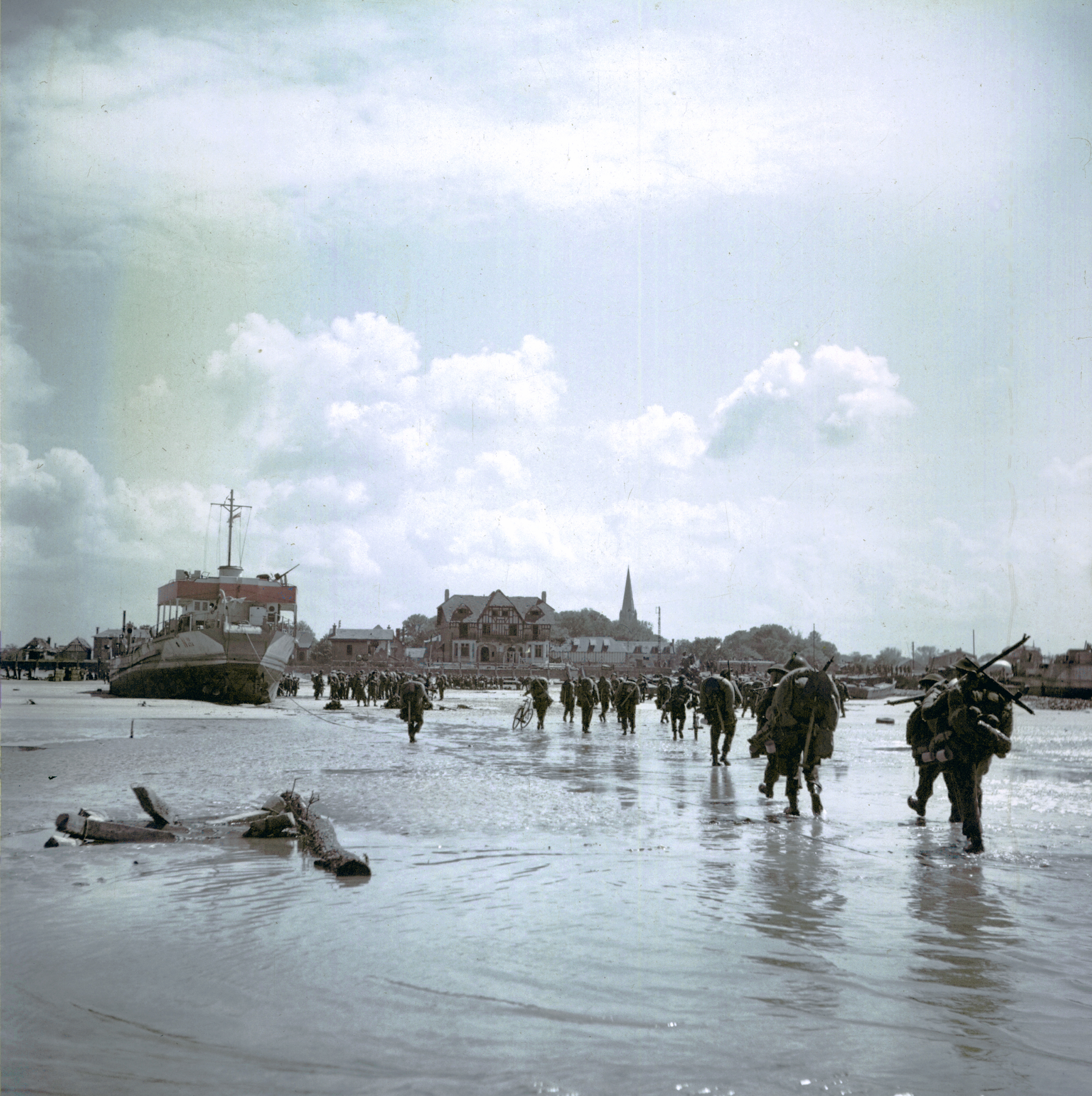
Canadian Soldiers at Bernières-sur-Mer, Juno Beach, June 6, 1944

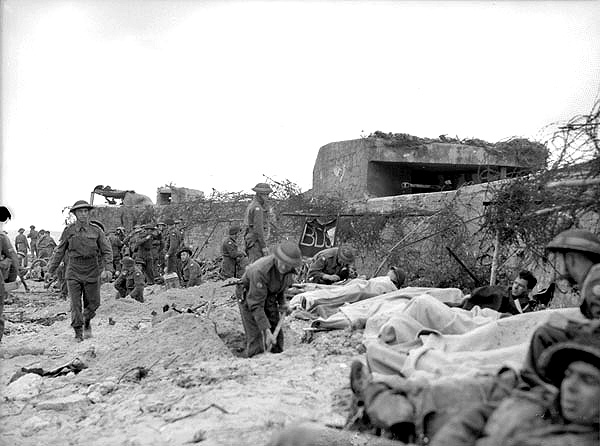
Canadian wounded on Juno Beach, on D-Day.

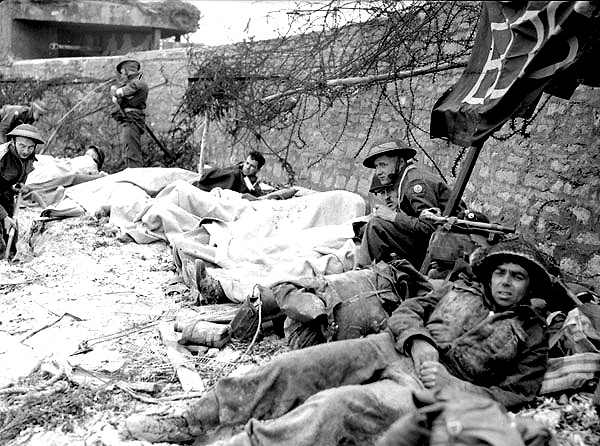
Canadian wounded await evacuation on Juno Beach, on D-Day

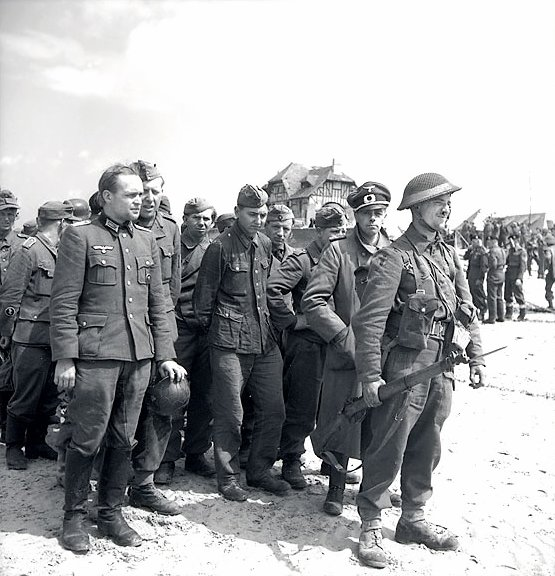
German prisoners who surrendered at Courseulles-sur-Mer, June 1944

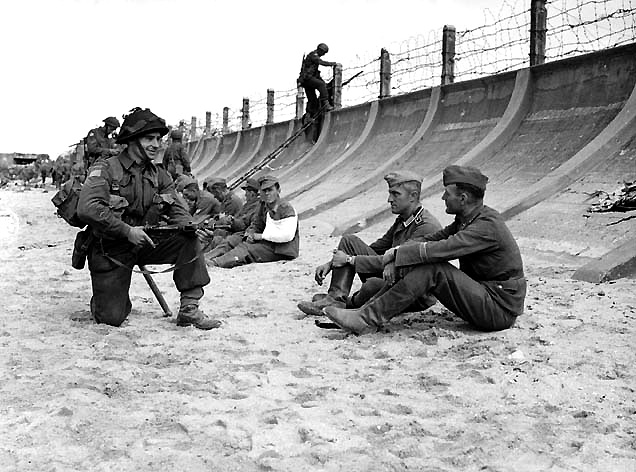
German prisoners on Juno Beach

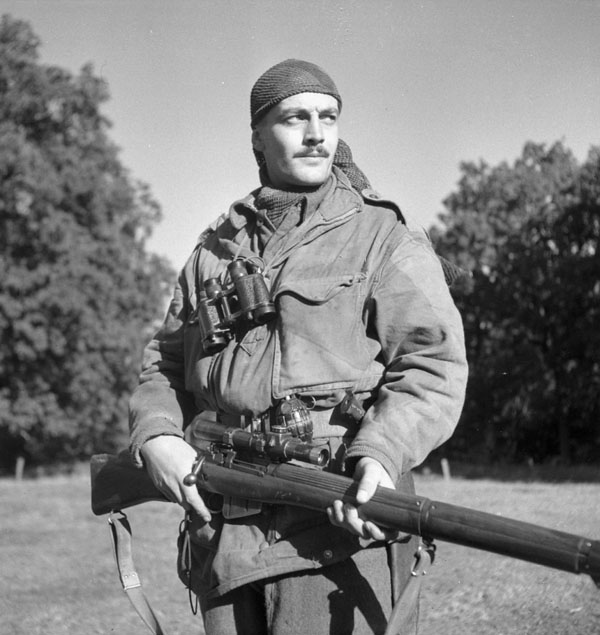
Harold Marshall of the Sniper Section, the Calgary Highlanders

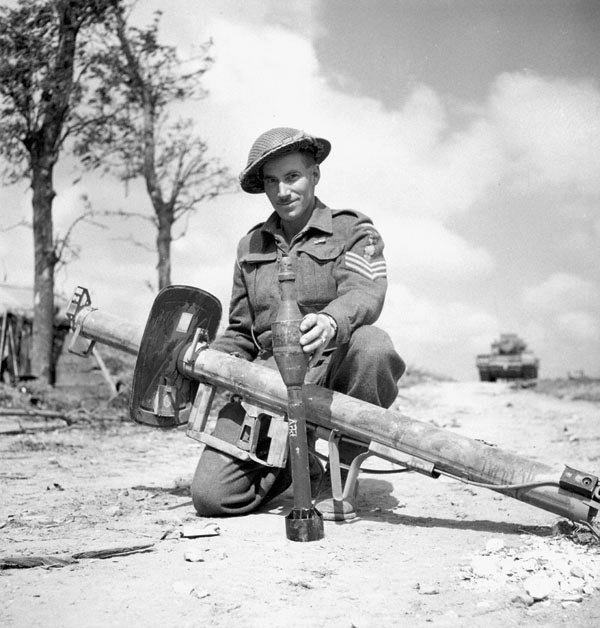
A Canadian soldier with a captured Panzerschrek

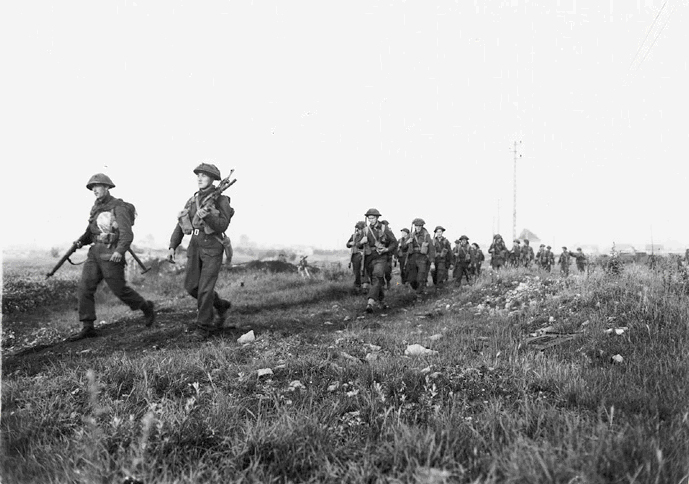
The Royal Winnipeg Rifles

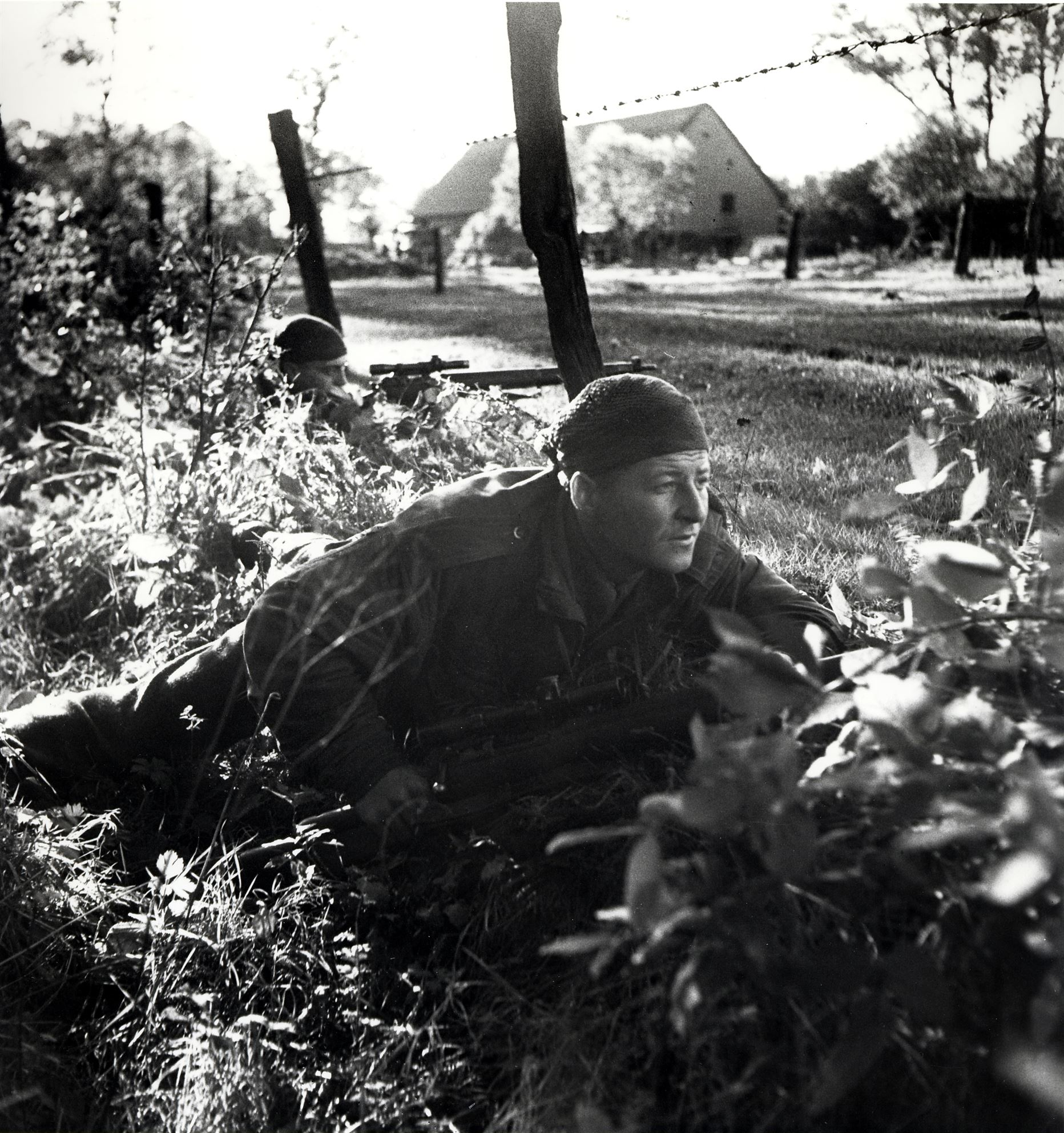
Highland snipers

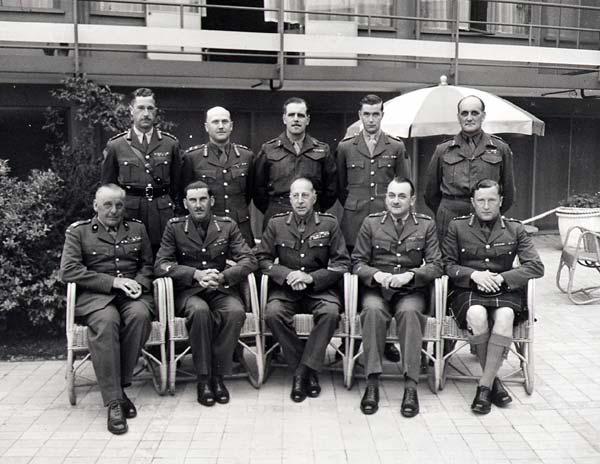
First Canadian Army generals, Victory, May 1945

=== Film Unit ===
Canadian Army Newsreel, No. 01 (1942)

== See also ==
- Juno Beach
- Ken Bell
- ECPAD
