= Ken Bell =

Canadian photographer (1914–2000)

George Kenneth Bell
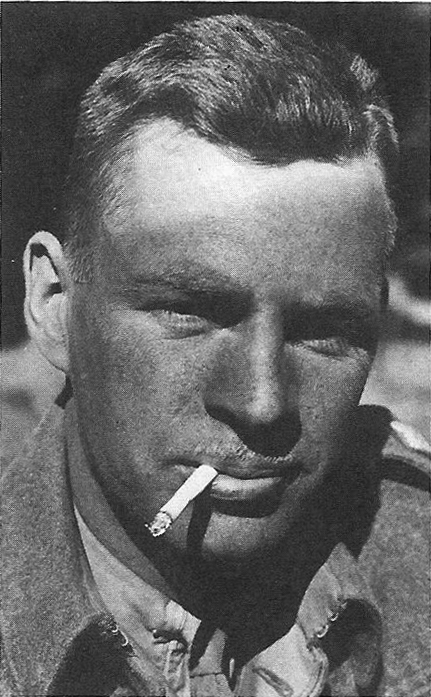
- Born: July 30, 1914; Toronto, Ontario, Canada
- Died: June 26, 2000 (aged 85); Gibsons, British Columbia, Canada
- Military career
- Allegiance: Canada
- Branch: Canadian Army
- Rank: Lieutenant-Colonel
- Unit: Canadian Army Film and Photo Unit
- Commands: Royal Regiment of Canada
- Conflicts: Normandy landings
- Other work: photographer

George Kenneth "Ken" Bell (July 30, 1914 – June 26, 2000) was a Canadian photographer who served with the Canadian armed forces during the Second World War. As a Lieutenant in the Canadian Army Film and Photo Unit, he participated in the Normandy Landings, disembarking at Juno Beach on June 6, 1944, with the Highland Light Infantry of Canada. Later he went on to photograph and record the liberation of France, Belgium and the Netherlands, and finally documented the occupation of Germany. After the war he had a successful career as a professional photographer, and published a number of books including Not in Vain, a collection of photographs showing the changes which had taken place in Europe since the end of the war.

== Early life ==
George Kenneth Bell was born in Toronto, Ontario, on July 30, 1914. He was the second son and the fourth of six children born to carpenter Charles Bell (1881–c. 1958) and Edith Bell, immigrants from Yorkshire, England. Charles Bell emigrated to Canada in 1906. The family lived at 1211 Dufferin St, Toronto.

== World War II ==
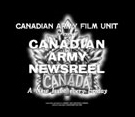
Canadian Army Film and Photo Unit

When Canada joined the war against Nazi Germany in 1939, Bell was posted to Ottawa as a public relations photographer. Later, he joined the Canadian Army Film and Photo Unit, with the rank of lieutenant. Along with a number of other photographers, Bell would go on to document Canada's participation in World War II.

The Canadian Army played a major role in the 1944 Normandy landings, landing at Juno beach, somewhat to the south of the previous raid at Dieppe in 1942. Like his better known American contemporary Robert Capa, Bell took part in the first day of the D-Day operation, disembarking at Juno Beach on June 6, 1944, with The Highland Light Infantry of Canada (now known as the Royal Highland Fusiliers of Canada), part of the 9th brigade. The 9th brigade was not in the first assault wave, but landed later in the morning and advanced through the lead brigades, which had taken heavy casualties.

Many of Bell's photographs were taken in colour - a first for the Canadian Army - though these did not become public until around twenty years later. They are the only surviving colour photographs of the Normandy Landings.

Members of the CFPU were often in the front line, and sometimes even ahead of it. During the liberation of Dieppe in 1944, as the Manitoba Dragoons awaited orders to advance, members of the CFPU including Ken Bell and Brian O'Regan were the first Allied servicemen to enter the town.

Bell's war photographs – taken with a Rolleiflex camera – are housed by the Library and Archives of Canada in Ottawa, Ontario. Many of the original negatives of his photographs are held by the Canadian Forces Photo Unit and the City of Toronto Archives.

Ken Bell's brother William Ernest Bell also served in the war; he volunteered for the Royal Canadian Air Force in 1941 and served in 440 Squadron flying Hawker Typhoons in the last months of the war.

== Post-war career ==
After the war Bell had a successful career as a professional photographer, publishing a number of collections of photographs taken during and after the war.

He also continued with an active role in the Canadian Army as an Officer Commanding of the Royal Regiment of Canada and then as the regiment's Honorary Lieutenant-Colonel.

In 1953 he published Curtain Call, a collection of photographs in which he "tried to show the changes brought by man and nature in the 5 years since VE day". This was followed in 1973 by Not in Vain, published by the University of Toronto Press, a collection of photographs taken partly during the war, and partly 25 years later when he returned to the same locations in France, Belgium and the Netherlands.

During the 1970s he worked as a freelance photographer, specialising in fashion, food and work in the advertising industry. He also had a long professional association with the National Ballet of Canada.

In 1990, he collaborated with Desmond Morton to publish a book detailing the history of the Royal Canadian Military Institute on the occasion of the Institute's 100th Anniversary.

== Family life ==
Colonel Bell was twice married. His first was to Marion "Molly" Alice Bell, with whom he adopted two daughters, Sue and Karen. After Molly's death he married Mary Lea Kenly of Toronto.

His nephew Richard Williams was an animator.

He died on June 26, 2000, in Gibsons, British Columbia, Canada.

== Awards ==
He was twice awarded the Photographer of the Year award by the society of Professional Photographers of Canada, in 1965 and 1966. In 1986 he received the Canadian Association of Photographers and Illustrators Lifetime Achievement Award.

== Published works ==
- Curtain Call, Intaglio Gravure Limited 1953
- Not in Vain, University of Toronto Press, 1973, ASIN: B001PQT32Y
- 100 years: The Royal Canadian Regiment, 1883-1983, Collier Macmillan Canada, 1983 ASIN: B000KFWQ16
- The Way We Were, University of Toronto Press, 1988
- Royal Canadian Military Institute: 100 Years 1890-1990, Morton and Bell, 1990.

== Gallery ==
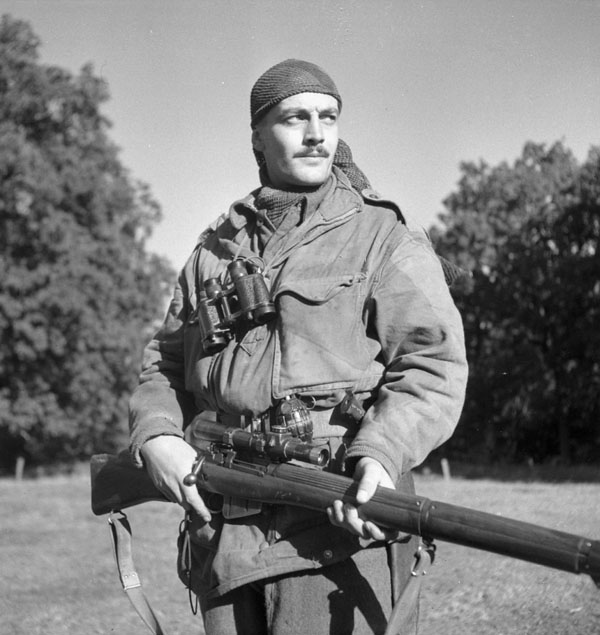
Sgt H A Marshall of the Sniper Section, Calgary Highlanders.

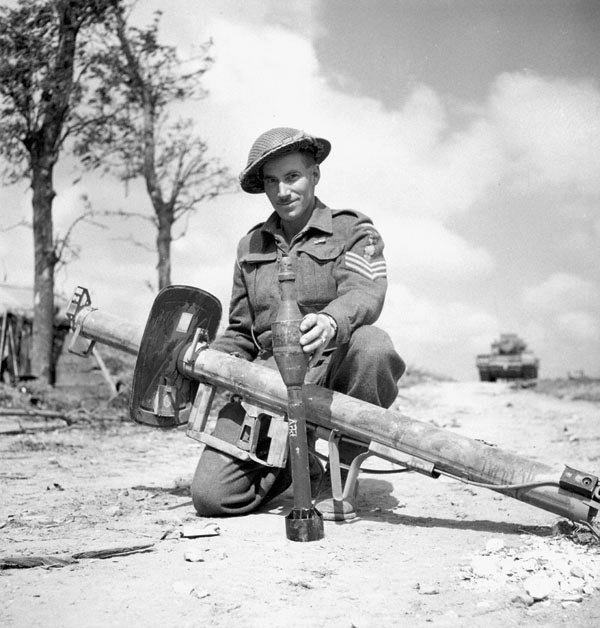
Panzerschreck

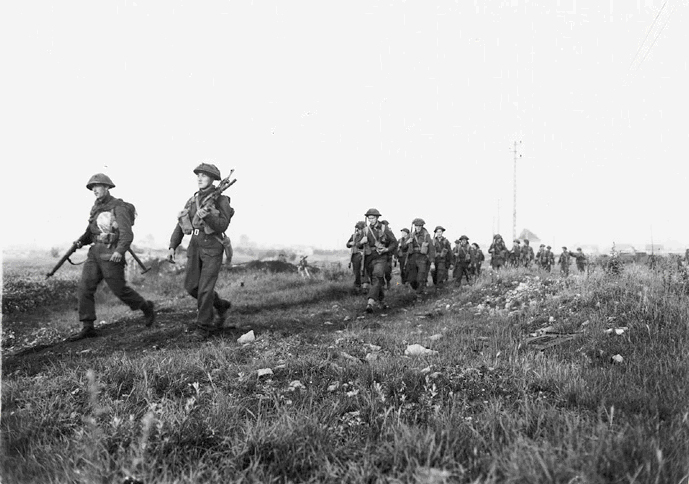
Royal Winnipeg Rifles

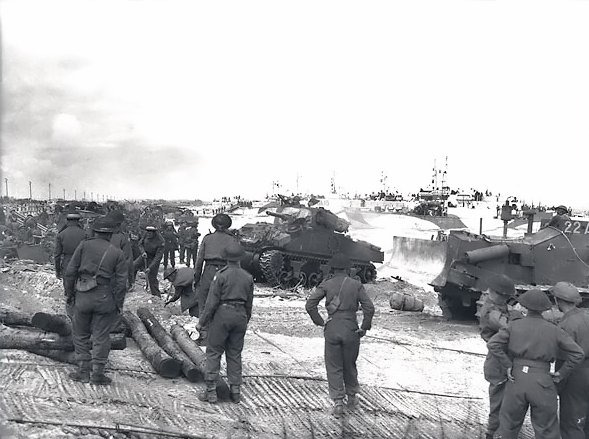
Crowded beach at Courseulles-sur-Mer

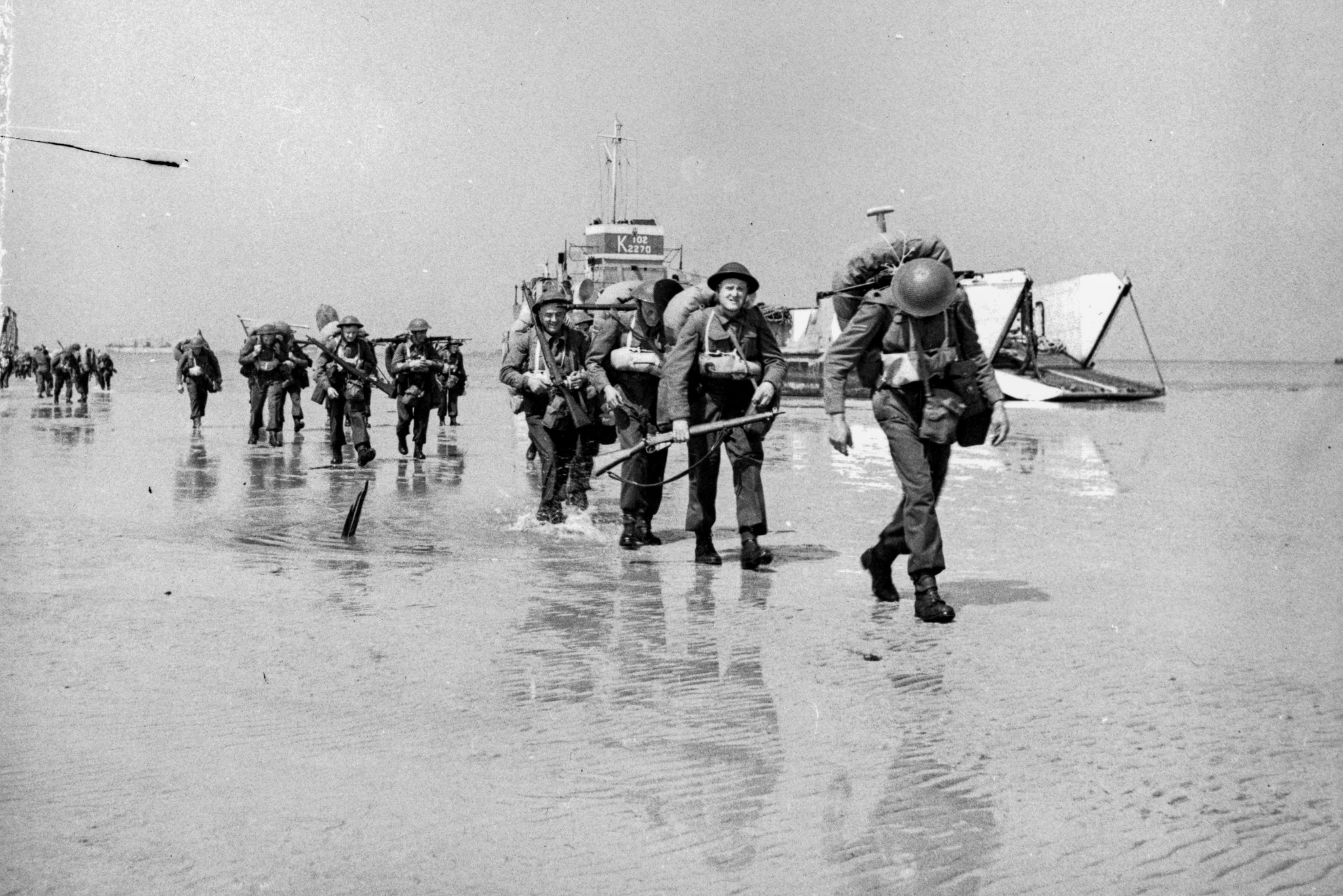
Canadian infantry reinforcements arrive at Courseulles-sur-Mer.

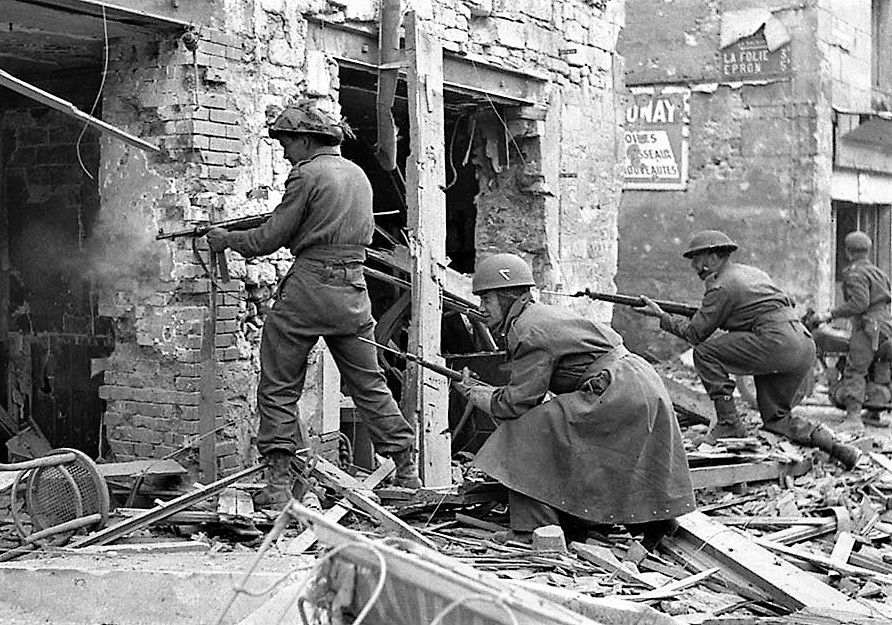
A Canadian soldier fires on the enemy in a house in Caen, July 10, 1944.

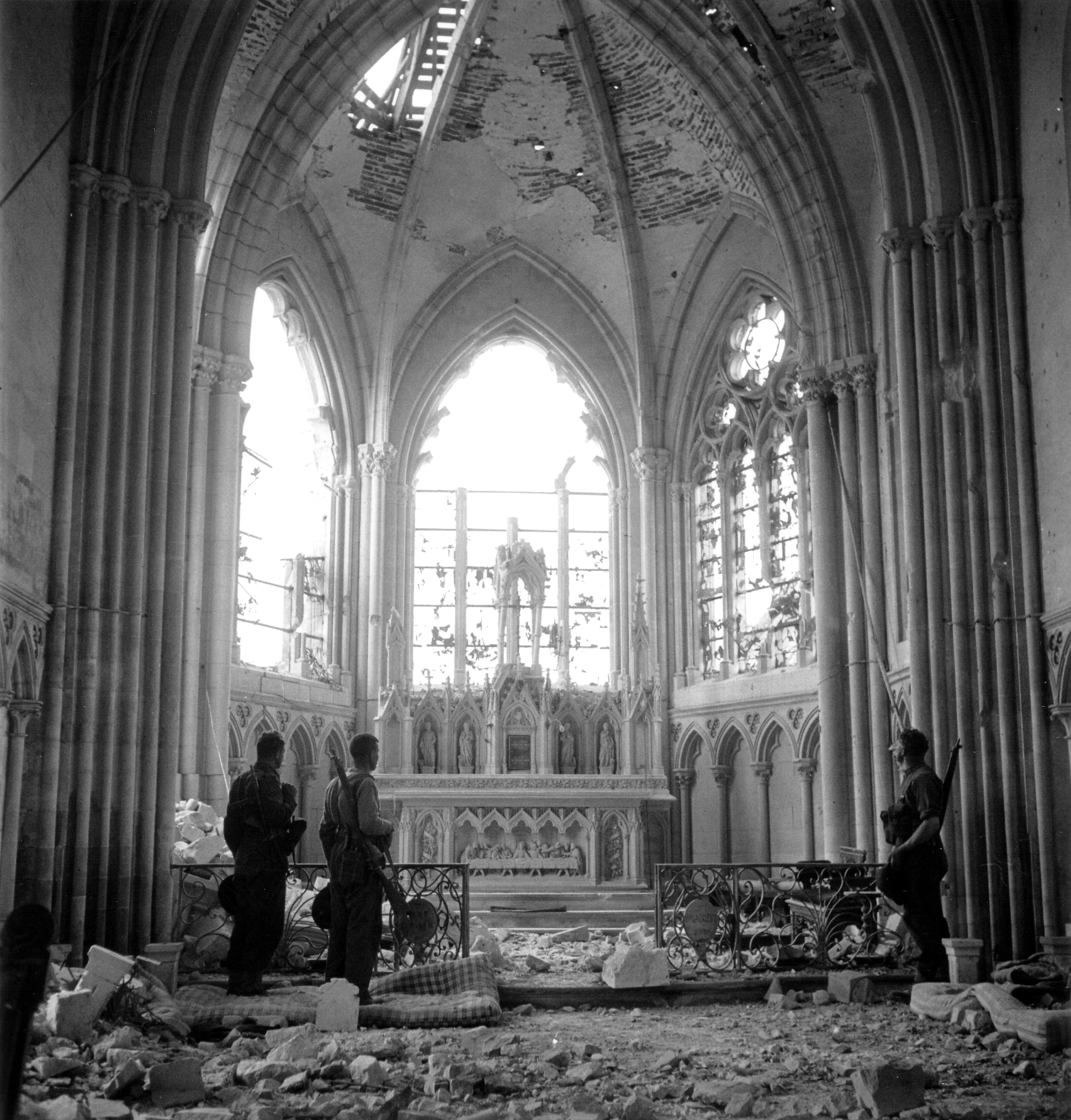
Unidentified Canadian Infantry in a Bombed Out Church in Carpiquet, near Caen, July 12, 1944

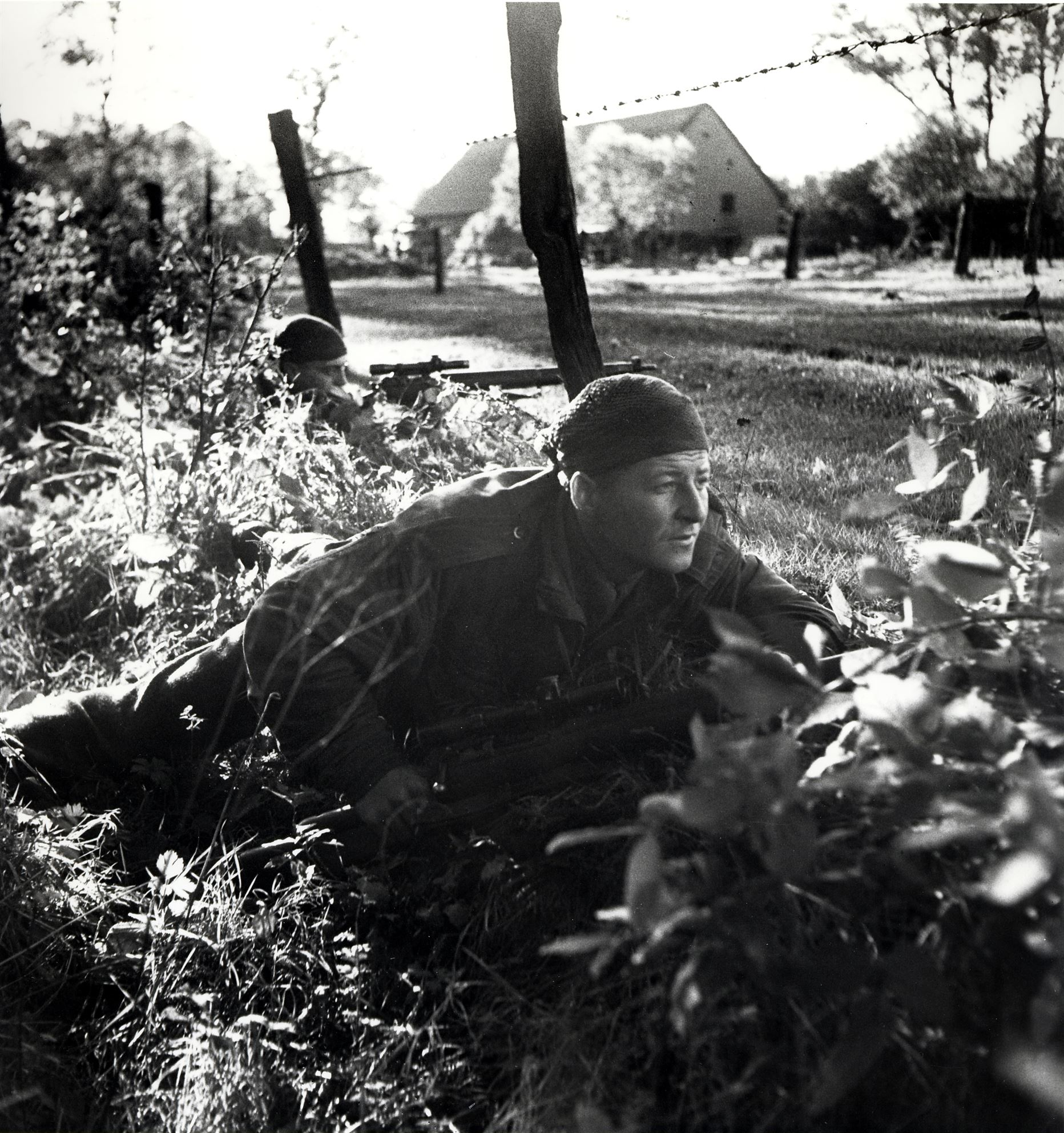
Highlanders

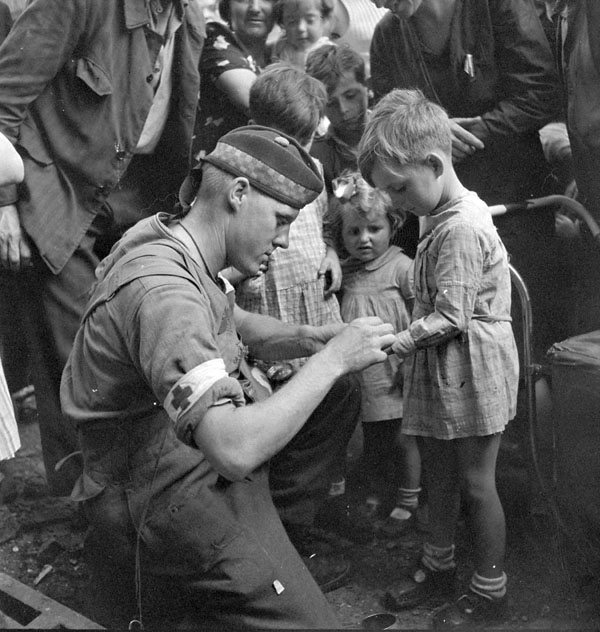
Canadian Private MacDonald gives first aid to a child

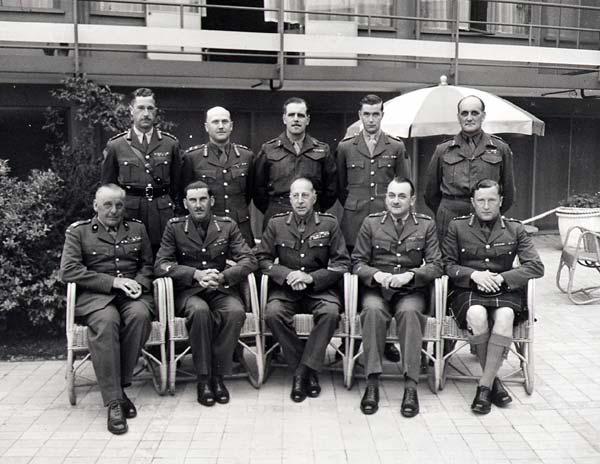
1st Canadian generals

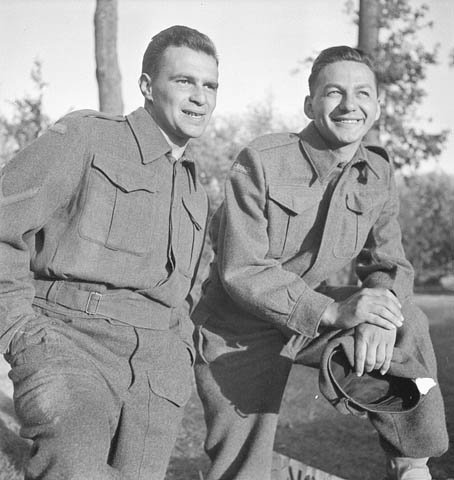
Wayne and Shuster

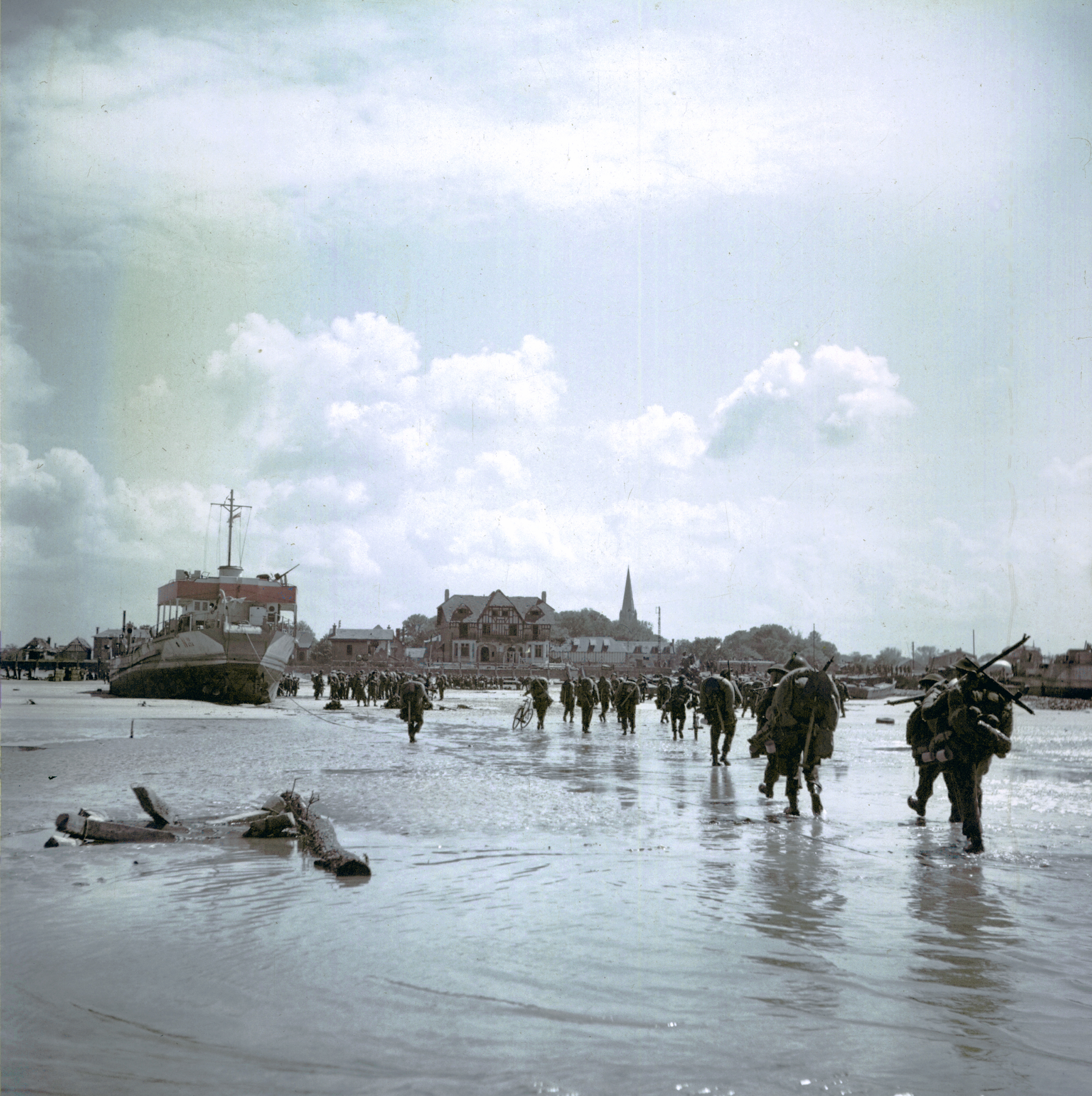
Canadian Soldiers Juno Beach
