= Wellington Barrier =

Historic fortifications in Belgian

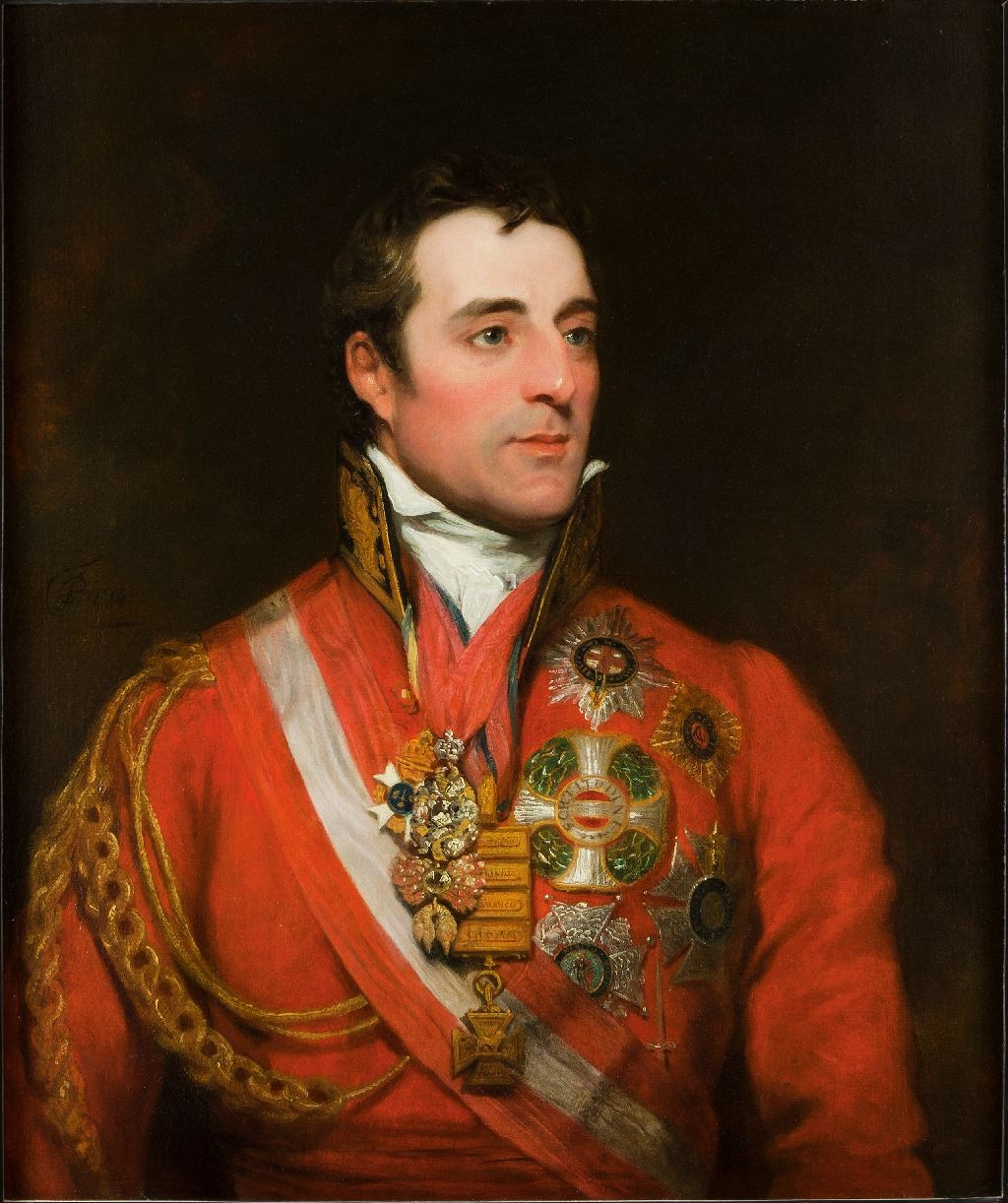
Portrait of the Duke of Wellington by Thomas Phillips, 1814

The Wellington Barrier (French: Barrière Wellington) were a series of military fortifications established on the southern border of what is today Belgium. Created following the Allied victory at the Battle of Waterloo in June 1815 and the subsequent Treaty of Paris, they were located in the newly-created United Kingdom of the Netherlands. They take their name from the British general and politician the Duke of Wellington, who has overall supervision for their construction and maintenance.

Following the final defeat of Napoleon, the Allies sought to prevent future French expansionism by creating a strong united Netherlands and constructed a series of new fortifications at strategic towns and cities along the French border. They were constructed by Dutch engineers and paid for by 60 million Francs of reparations from France as well as subsidies from Britain. The fortifications were garrisoned by troops of the Dutch Army. These included Antwerp, Maastricht, Liège, Huy, Namur, Dinant, Bouillon, Mariembourg, Philippeville, Charleroi, Binche, Ath, Oudenaarde, Ghent, Tournai, Menin, Ypres, Nieuwpoort and Ostend.

Following the withdrawal of the Allied Army of Occupation from France in late 1818 after the Congress of Aix-la-Chapelle, the Barrier became the major form of Allied deterrent against French expansion. The Duke of Wellington continued to visit annually every autumn to inspect the condition of the defences.

After the Belgian Revolution broke out in August 1830 many of the fortresses were seized by the insurgents. By the Treaty of London of November 1831 Britain and France agreed to recognise Belgian independence, having installed a mutually acceptable candidate Leopold on the throne in Brussels. Parts of the barrier became part of the new Belgian kingdom's own defensive system. However, the Fortress Convention agreed in London the same year led to the dismantlement of several of the fortifications. The close relationship between Belgian, Britain and France (symbolised by the marriage between Leopold and Louise of Orléans in 1832) rapidly reduced the need for southern defences.

== Bibliography ==
- De Graaf, Beatrice. Fighting Terror after Napoleon: How Europe Became Secure after 1815. Cambridge University Press, 2020.
- Koch, Jeroen, Van der Meulen, Dik & Van Zanten, Jeroen. The House of Orange in Revolution and War: A European History, 1772–1890. Reaktion Books, 2022.
- Lepage, Jean-Denis. Dutch Fortifications: An Illustrated History from the Roman Era to the Cold War. McFarland, 2021.
- Muir, Rory. Wellington: Waterloo and the Fortunes of Peace 1814–1852. Yale University Press, 2013.
