= Fort Brasschaat =

Belgian fort near Antwerp, Belgium

The entrance to Fort Brasschaat today.

Fort Brasschaat is a Belgian fortification in Brasschaat, Belgium, north of the city of Antwerp. Fort Brasschaat was part of the 3rd, and final, phase of defenses constructed around Antwerp. Antwerp was chosen in 1859 to become the “National Redoubt” in case of invasion. Many brick fortifications were constructed around the city, but they all became obsolete with the advent of heavier artillery and the high-explosive shell. Fort Brasschaat was meant to replace and supplement the aging fortifications around Antwerp.

== History ==
Fort Brasschaat was part of the final phase of fortification construction around Antwerp, alongside 10 other concrete armored forts and 12 concrete armored redoubts, meant to plug the gaps between the larger forts. Work on constructing Fort Brasschaat was started in 1909, and wrapped up in 1912. The fort was constructed on its own artificial island, and is a triangular shape. When Germany invaded in August 1914, Fort Brasschaat was garrisoned by 330 Belgian troops. Although German troops besieged Antwerp, they besieged it from the south, so Fort Brasschaat did not see any combat. The fort was evacuated during the siege, and was turned over to the Germans on October 10, 1914.

Fort Brasschaat was armed with:

- 1 22 cm-thick armored turret containing two 15 cm howitzers
- 2 22 cm-thick armored turrets containing one 12 cm howitzer each
- 4 7.5 cm guns in armored domes
- 8 heavy machine guns (added after WW1)
- 12 light machine guns (added after WW1)

A view of the demolished part of the fort from the anti-tank canal that surrounds the fort.

Between World War I and II, a 33 km-long anti-tank ditch was constructed, and was meant to both stop tanks and link all of the forts together. In 1926, a 6km long military rail line from the train station at Kapellen was built, linking it to Brasschaat. Behind the fort is a derelict monument to eight cavalry soldiers who died in an explosion in 1937. The crater from the explosion can still be seen. Fort Brasschaat didn't see combat during World War II because of new attacking techniques such as the Blitzkrieg. After the war, the Belgian authorities used Fort Brasschaat as a training ground.

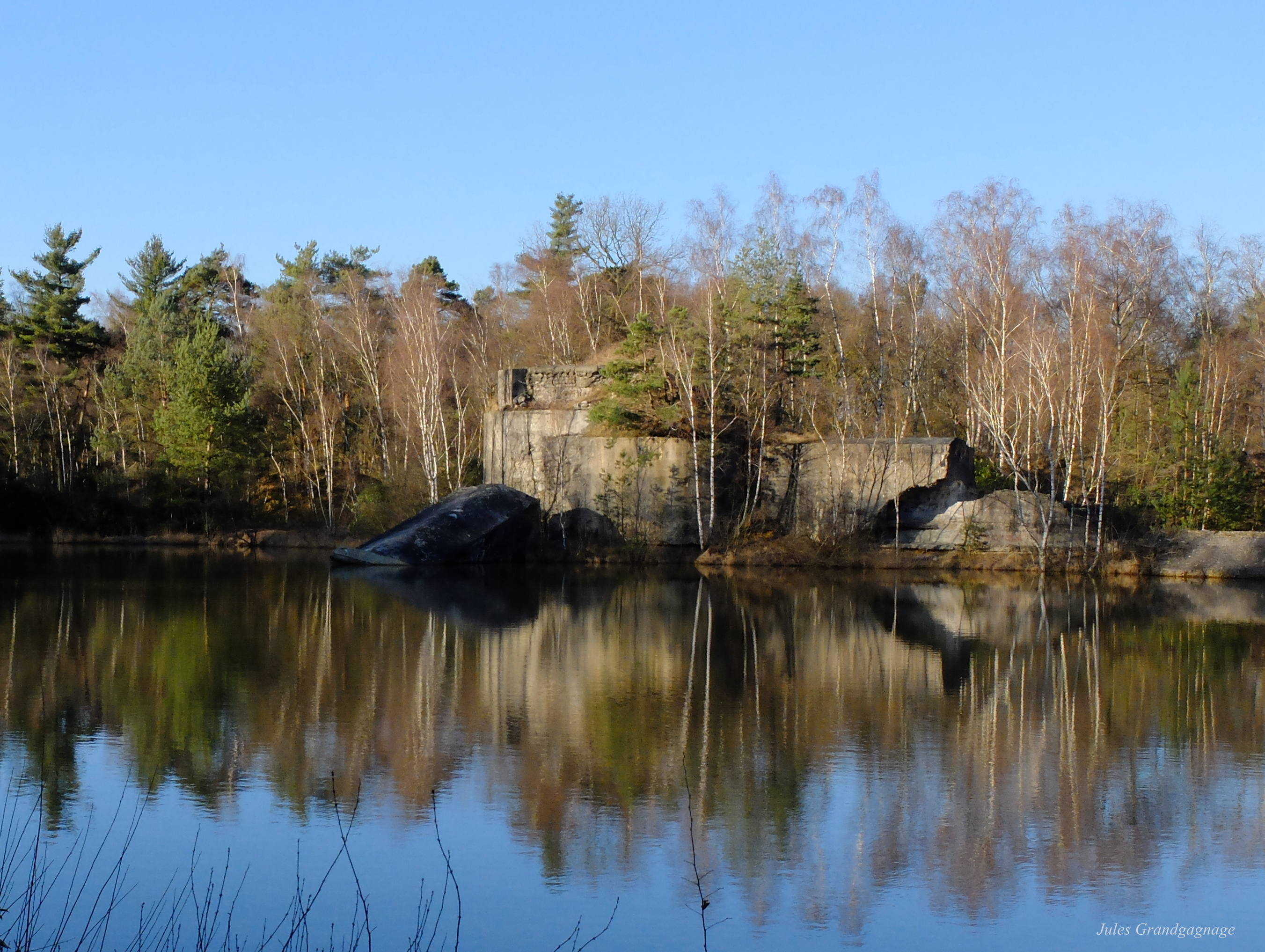
Part of the demolished left side of the fort.

In 1970, Belgian authorities attempted to dynamite the fort because it was apparently in the way. Only part of the demolition succeeded, and the left wing of the fort was demolished and slid into the surrounding moat. The left wing was the only part of the fort that was successfully demolished, and most of the fort lies the way it once was, but with some minor damage. Over the years, species of endangered bats have called the forts in the area home, and Fort Brasschaat is no different. Fort Brasschaat was designated a European Special Protection Zone on December 7, 2004. Fort Brasschaat hosts the largest number of bats of any fort around Antwerp, at 800–900 bats, compared to the typical 20–30 of other forts. The fort is still under military ownership today, but is abandoned.
